This is a partial list of unnumbered minor planets for principal provisional designations assigned between 16 June and 15 September 2003. , a total of 523 bodies remain unnumbered for this period. Objects for this year are listed on the following pages: A–E · F–G · H–L · M–R · Si · Sii · Siii · Siv · T · Ui · Uii · Uiii · Uiv · V · Wi · Wii and X–Y. Also see previous and next year.

M 

|- id="2003 MN" bgcolor=#FFC2E0
| 7 || 2003 MN || APO || 23.8 || data-sort-value="0.062" | 62 m || single || 1 day || 23 Jun 2003 || 23 || align=left | Disc.: LINEAR || 
|- id="2003 MU" bgcolor=#FFC2E0
| 0 || 2003 MU || AMO || 20.4 || data-sort-value="0.30" | 300 m || multiple || 2003–2012 || 17 Nov 2012 || 133 || align=left | Disc.: LONEOSPotentially hazardous object || 
|- id="2003 MV" bgcolor=#FA8072
| 1 || 2003 MV || MCA || 18.4 || 1.2 km || multiple || 2003–2019 || 29 Mar 2019 || 32 || align=left | Disc.: Spacewatch || 
|- id="2003 ME1" bgcolor=#FFC2E0
| 6 ||  || APO || 23.6 || data-sort-value="0.068" | 68 m || single || 36 days || 29 Jul 2003 || 69 || align=left | Disc.: LINEAR || 
|- id="2003 MB2" bgcolor=#fefefe
| 0 ||  || MBA-I || 17.6 || data-sort-value="0.90" | 900 m || multiple || 2003–2020 || 27 Feb 2020 || 103 || align=left | Disc.: Tenagra II Obs.Alt.: 2014 MQ42 || 
|- id="2003 MS2" bgcolor=#FFC2E0
| 0 ||  || APO || 21.21 || data-sort-value="0.20" | 200 m || multiple || 2003–2022 || 22 Jan 2022 || 241 || align=left | Disc.: LONEOSPotentially hazardous object || 
|- id="2003 MZ2" bgcolor=#FA8072
| 2 ||  || MCA || 16.6 || 1.4 km || multiple || 2003–2020 || 07 Dec 2020 || 88 || align=left | Disc.: LINEAR || 
|- id="2003 MK4" bgcolor=#FFC2E0
| 2 ||  || APO || 20.9 || data-sort-value="0.23" | 230 m || multiple || 2003–2021 || 09 Jun 2021 || 244 || align=left | Disc.: LINEARPotentially hazardous object || 
|- id="2003 ME7" bgcolor=#FFC2E0
| 1 ||  || AMO || 20.7 || data-sort-value="0.26" | 260 m || multiple || 2003–2015 || 08 Aug 2015 || 63 || align=left | Disc.: LINEAR || 
|- id="2003 MF7" bgcolor=#FA8072
| 0 ||  || MCA || 18.9 || data-sort-value="0.49" | 490 m || multiple || 2003–2016 || 28 Jun 2016 || 120 || align=left | Disc.: LINEAR || 
|- id="2003 MW7" bgcolor=#FFC2E0
| 1 ||  || APO || 21.49 || data-sort-value="0.18" | 180 m || multiple || 2003-2022 || 24 Jun 2022 || 73 || align=left | Disc.: LINEAR || 
|- id="2003 MH12" bgcolor=#d6d6d6
| 0 ||  || MBA-O || 16.2 || 3.2 km || multiple || 2003–2020 || 20 Nov 2020 || 57 || align=left | Disc.: LINEARAlt.: 2014 WK390 || 
|- id="2003 MF13" bgcolor=#E9E9E9
| 0 ||  || MBA-M || 17.4 || 1.4 km || multiple || 2003–2016 || 19 Oct 2016 || 51 || align=left | Disc.: SDSS || 
|- id="2003 MJ13" bgcolor=#fefefe
| 1 ||  || HUN || 18.5 || data-sort-value="0.59" | 590 m || multiple || 2003–2019 || 24 Apr 2019 || 39 || align=left | Disc.: Spacewatch || 
|- id="2003 MK13" bgcolor=#d6d6d6
| 0 ||  || MBA-O || 16.8 || 2.4 km || multiple || 2003–2020 || 16 Oct 2020 || 45 || align=left | Disc.: SDSS || 
|}
back to top

N 

|- id="2003 NB" bgcolor=#FFC2E0
| 1 || 2003 NB || AMO || 19.7 || data-sort-value="0.41" | 410 m || multiple || 2003–2006 || 03 Jun 2006 || 200 || align=left | Disc.: LINEAR || 
|- id="2003 ND" bgcolor=#FFC2E0
| 1 || 2003 ND || AMO || 18.7 || data-sort-value="0.65" | 650 m || multiple || 2003–2016 || 02 May 2016 || 141 || align=left | Disc.: AMOS || 
|- id="2003 NW" bgcolor=#FA8072
| 2 || 2003 NW || MCA || 17.8 || 1.2 km || multiple || 2003–2020 || 29 May 2020 || 90 || align=left | Disc.: LINEARAlt.: 2016 NO1 || 
|- id="2003 NX" bgcolor=#FA8072
| 0 || 2003 NX || MCA || 18.38 || data-sort-value="0.63" | 630 m || multiple || 2003–2021 || 28 Nov 2021 || 69 || align=left | Disc.: LINEAR || 
|- id="2003 NM3" bgcolor=#FA8072
| 0 ||  || MCA || 17.6 || data-sort-value="0.90" | 900 m || multiple || 2003–2021 || 06 Jan 2021 || 555 || align=left | Disc.: LINEAR || 
|- id="2003 NU3" bgcolor=#E9E9E9
| 1 ||  || MBA-M || 18.0 || 1.1 km || multiple || 2003–2020 || 15 Jul 2020 || 96 || align=left | Disc.: SpacewatchAlt.: 2016 NN6 || 
|- id="2003 NJ5" bgcolor=#E9E9E9
| 1 ||  || MBA-M || 18.2 || data-sort-value="0.68" | 680 m || multiple || 2003–2020 || 22 Aug 2020 || 49 || align=left | Disc.: VATT || 
|- id="2003 NM5" bgcolor=#d6d6d6
| 0 ||  || MBA-O || 16.89 || 2.3 km || multiple || 2003–2021 || 09 Jul 2021 || 51 || align=left | Disc.: VATT || 
|- id="2003 NU5" bgcolor=#FA8072
| – ||  || MCA || 19.5 || data-sort-value="0.70" | 700 m || single || 2 days || 08 Jul 2003 || 9 || align=left | Disc.: Spacewatch || 
|- id="2003 NV5" bgcolor=#FA8072
| 0 ||  || MCA || 20.58 || data-sort-value="0.23" | 230 m || multiple || 2003–2019 || 26 Sep 2019 || 35 || align=left | Disc.: Spacewatch || 
|- id="2003 NZ5" bgcolor=#d6d6d6
| 3 ||  || MBA-O || 17.92 || 1.5 km || multiple || 2003-2021 || 30 Aug 2021 || 28 || align=left | Disc.: VATT || 
|- id="2003 NA6" bgcolor=#d6d6d6
| 0 ||  || MBA-O || 16.79 || 3.1 km || multiple || 2003–2022 || 26 Jan 2022 || 170 || align=left | Disc.: Spacewatch || 
|- id="2003 NB6" bgcolor=#fefefe
| 0 ||  || MBA-I || 17.96 || 1.5 km || multiple || 2003–2021 || 06 Apr 2021 || 89 || align=left | Disc.: Spacewatch || 
|- id="2003 NY6" bgcolor=#fefefe
| 1 ||  || MBA-I || 18.6 || data-sort-value="0.57" | 570 m || multiple || 2003–2019 || 10 Jul 2019 || 59 || align=left | Disc.: Piszkéstető Stn. || 
|- id="2003 NA7" bgcolor=#FA8072
| 1 ||  || MCA || 18.9 || data-sort-value="0.49" | 490 m || multiple || 2003–2020 || 12 Dec 2020 || 200 || align=left | Disc.: NEAT || 
|- id="2003 NL7" bgcolor=#FFC2E0
| 2 ||  || AMO || 20.0 || data-sort-value="0.36" | 360 m || multiple || 2003–2006 || 26 Apr 2006 || 118 || align=left | Disc.: NEAT || 
|- id="2003 NA9" bgcolor=#E9E9E9
| 0 ||  || MBA-M || 17.21 || 1.1 km || multiple || 2003–2022 || 10 Jan 2022 || 82 || align=left | Disc.: SpacewatchAlt.: 2012 XG40 || 
|- id="2003 NC9" bgcolor=#fefefe
| 0 ||  || MBA-I || 18.0 || data-sort-value="0.75" | 750 m || multiple || 2003–2020 || 24 Mar 2020 || 43 || align=left | Disc.: Mauna Kea Obs. || 
|- id="2003 NP10" bgcolor=#E9E9E9
| 0 ||  || MBA-M || 16.5 || 1.5 km || multiple || 1999–2021 || 08 Jan 2021 || 233 || align=left | Disc.: Spacewatch || 
|- id="2003 NQ10" bgcolor=#fefefe
| 0 ||  || HUN || 18.3 || data-sort-value="0.65" | 650 m || multiple || 2003–2020 || 03 Jan 2020 || 57 || align=left | Disc.: Spacewatch || 
|- id="2003 NC11" bgcolor=#d6d6d6
| 0 ||  || MBA-O || 16.1 || 3.4 km || multiple || 2003–2020 || 08 Dec 2020 || 117 || align=left | Disc.: Spacewatch || 
|- id="2003 NF13" bgcolor=#E9E9E9
| 0 ||  || MBA-M || 17.2 || 1.5 km || multiple || 2001–2021 || 04 Jan 2021 || 315 || align=left | Disc.: CINEOSAlt.: 2015 HE154 || 
|- id="2003 NO13" bgcolor=#d6d6d6
| 1 ||  || MBA-O || 16.9 || 2.3 km || multiple || 2003–2018 || 15 Oct 2018 || 94 || align=left | Disc.: Spacewatch || 
|- id="2003 NQ13" bgcolor=#d6d6d6
| 0 ||  || HIL || 15.2 || 5.1 km || multiple || 2003–2020 || 16 Nov 2020 || 137 || align=left | Disc.: Spacewatch || 
|- id="2003 NS13" bgcolor=#E9E9E9
| 0 ||  || MBA-M || 16.95 || 1.7 km || multiple || 2003–2021 || 30 Oct 2021 || 88 || align=left | Disc.: Spacewatch || 
|- id="2003 NT13" bgcolor=#d6d6d6
| 0 ||  || MBA-O || 16.4 || 2.9 km || multiple || 2003–2021 || 21 Jan 2021 || 109 || align=left | Disc.: Spacewatch || 
|- id="2003 NU13" bgcolor=#fefefe
| 0 ||  || MBA-I || 17.9 || data-sort-value="0.78" | 780 m || multiple || 2003–2020 || 08 Sep 2020 || 114 || align=left | Disc.: SpacewatchAlt.: 2011 CG130 || 
|- id="2003 NV13" bgcolor=#fefefe
| 0 ||  || MBA-I || 17.67 || data-sort-value="0.87" | 870 m || multiple || 2003–2021 || 27 Dec 2021 || 128 || align=left | Disc.: NEATAlt.: 2010 JP93 || 
|- id="2003 NW13" bgcolor=#fefefe
| 0 ||  || MBA-I || 17.9 || data-sort-value="0.78" | 780 m || multiple || 2003–2021 || 16 Jan 2021 || 62 || align=left | Disc.: Spacewatch || 
|- id="2003 NX13" bgcolor=#E9E9E9
| 0 ||  || MBA-M || 17.4 || data-sort-value="0.98" | 980 m || multiple || 2003–2020 || 10 Dec 2020 || 97 || align=left | Disc.: Spacewatch || 
|- id="2003 NZ13" bgcolor=#fefefe
| 0 ||  || MBA-I || 18.09 || data-sort-value="0.72" | 720 m || multiple || 2003–2021 || 08 Aug 2021 || 89 || align=left | Disc.: Spacewatch || 
|- id="2003 NA14" bgcolor=#fefefe
| 0 ||  || MBA-I || 18.28 || data-sort-value="0.66" | 660 m || multiple || 2003–2021 || 14 Apr 2021 || 97 || align=left | Disc.: Spacewatch || 
|- id="2003 NB14" bgcolor=#E9E9E9
| 0 ||  || MBA-M || 17.23 || 2.0 km || multiple || 2003–2021 || 12 May 2021 || 62 || align=left | Disc.: NEAT || 
|- id="2003 NC14" bgcolor=#E9E9E9
| 0 ||  || MBA-M || 17.29 || 1.5 km || multiple || 2003–2021 || 15 Sep 2021 || 104 || align=left | Disc.: Spacewatch || 
|- id="2003 ND14" bgcolor=#fefefe
| 0 ||  || MBA-I || 18.9 || data-sort-value="0.49" | 490 m || multiple || 2003–2019 || 01 Nov 2019 || 70 || align=left | Disc.: Spacewatch || 
|- id="2003 NE14" bgcolor=#E9E9E9
| 0 ||  || MBA-M || 17.3 || 1.0 km || multiple || 2003–2021 || 08 Jan 2021 || 107 || align=left | Disc.: Spacewatch || 
|- id="2003 NF14" bgcolor=#d6d6d6
| 0 ||  || MBA-O || 16.3 || 3.1 km || multiple || 2003–2020 || 21 Sep 2020 || 99 || align=left | Disc.: NEATAlt.: 2010 AW115 || 
|- id="2003 NG14" bgcolor=#E9E9E9
| 0 ||  || MBA-M || 17.9 || 1.5 km || multiple || 2003–2017 || 28 Sep 2017 || 65 || align=left | Disc.: SpacewatchAlt.: 2015 BN525 || 
|- id="2003 NH14" bgcolor=#d6d6d6
| 0 ||  || MBA-O || 16.69 || 2.6 km || multiple || 2003–2021 || 11 May 2021 || 109 || align=left | Disc.: Spacewatch || 
|- id="2003 NJ14" bgcolor=#d6d6d6
| 0 ||  || MBA-O || 16.0 || 3.5 km || multiple || 2003–2021 || 18 Jan 2021 || 115 || align=left | Disc.: SpacewatchAlt.: 2010 AQ110 || 
|- id="2003 NK14" bgcolor=#fefefe
| 0 ||  || MBA-I || 18.10 || data-sort-value="0.71" | 710 m || multiple || 2003–2021 || 11 Nov 2021 || 122 || align=left | Disc.: Spacewatch || 
|- id="2003 NM14" bgcolor=#fefefe
| 0 ||  || MBA-I || 18.16 || data-sort-value="0.69" | 690 m || multiple || 2003–2021 || 19 May 2021 || 69 || align=left | Disc.: Spacewatch || 
|- id="2003 NQ14" bgcolor=#fefefe
| 0 ||  || MBA-I || 18.3 || data-sort-value="0.65" | 650 m || multiple || 2003–2019 || 30 Jun 2019 || 42 || align=left | Disc.: NEAT || 
|- id="2003 NR14" bgcolor=#fefefe
| 0 ||  || MBA-I || 18.38 || data-sort-value="0.63" | 630 m || multiple || 2003–2021 || 17 Apr 2021 || 45 || align=left | Disc.: NEAT || 
|- id="2003 NS14" bgcolor=#d6d6d6
| 0 ||  || MBA-O || 17.5 || 1.8 km || multiple || 2002–2019 || 23 Oct 2019 || 38 || align=left | Disc.: Spacewatch || 
|- id="2003 NT14" bgcolor=#E9E9E9
| 0 ||  || MBA-M || 17.10 || 1.6 km || multiple || 2003–2021 || 05 Dec 2021 || 152 || align=left | Disc.: Spacewatch || 
|- id="2003 NU14" bgcolor=#d6d6d6
| 0 ||  || MBA-O || 17.55 || 1.7 km || multiple || 2003–2021 || 19 Apr 2021 || 45 || align=left | Disc.: Spacewatch || 
|- id="2003 NW14" bgcolor=#fefefe
| 3 ||  || MBA-I || 19.0 || data-sort-value="0.47" | 470 m || multiple || 2003–2018 || 30 Sep 2018 || 24 || align=left | Disc.: Spacewatch || 
|- id="2003 NX14" bgcolor=#d6d6d6
| 0 ||  || MBA-O || 16.8 || 2.4 km || multiple || 2003–2021 || 08 Jan 2021 || 91 || align=left | Disc.: Spacewatch || 
|- id="2003 NY14" bgcolor=#E9E9E9
| 0 ||  || MBA-M || 17.3 || 1.0 km || multiple || 2003–2021 || 12 Jan 2021 || 98 || align=left | Disc.: Spacewatch || 
|- id="2003 NZ14" bgcolor=#d6d6d6
| 0 ||  || MBA-O || 17.0 || 2.2 km || multiple || 2003–2019 || 23 Aug 2019 || 41 || align=left | Disc.: Spacewatch || 
|- id="2003 NA15" bgcolor=#E9E9E9
| 0 ||  || MBA-M || 18.37 || data-sort-value="0.63" | 630 m || multiple || 2003–2021 || 30 Nov 2021 || 31 || align=left | Disc.: Spacewatch || 
|- id="2003 NB15" bgcolor=#fefefe
| 0 ||  || HUN || 18.78 || data-sort-value="0.52" | 520 m || multiple || 2003–2021 || 16 Apr 2021 || 52 || align=left | Disc.: Spacewatch || 
|- id="2003 NE15" bgcolor=#E9E9E9
| 3 ||  || MBA-M || 18.1 || data-sort-value="0.71" | 710 m || multiple || 2003–2020 || 11 Nov 2020 || 66 || align=left | Disc.: SpacewatchAdded on 17 January 2021 || 
|- id="2003 NF15" bgcolor=#E9E9E9
| 0 ||  || MBA-M || 17.0 || 1.2 km || multiple || 1991–2021 || 17 Jan 2021 || 80 || align=left | Disc.: NEATAdded on 17 January 2021 || 
|- id="2003 NG15" bgcolor=#E9E9E9
| 0 ||  || MBA-M || 17.45 || 1.4 km || multiple || 2003–2021 || 08 Dec 2021 || 111 || align=left | Disc.: SpacewatchAdded on 9 March 2021 || 
|- id="2003 NH15" bgcolor=#d6d6d6
| 0 ||  || MBA-O || 17.5 || 1.8 km || multiple || 2002–2019 || 23 Sep 2019 || 32 || align=left | Disc.: SpacewatchAdded on 21 August 2021 || 
|- id="2003 NJ15" bgcolor=#E9E9E9
| 3 ||  || MBA-M || 18.1 || 1.3 km || multiple || 2003–2017 || 23 Nov 2017 || 18 || align=left | Disc.: SpacewatchAdded on 24 December 2021 || 
|}
back to top

O 

|- id="2003 OF" bgcolor=#d6d6d6
| 0 || 2003 OF || MBA-O || 16.38 || 2.9 km || multiple || 2003–2021 || 28 Nov 2021 || 158 || align=left | Disc.: Siding Spring Obs. || 
|- id="2003 OL" bgcolor=#fefefe
| 2 || 2003 OL || MBA-I || 19.6 || data-sort-value="0.36" | 360 m || multiple || 2003–2017 || 13 Sep 2017 || 18 || align=left | Disc.: Siding Spring Obs. || 
|- id="2003 OY2" bgcolor=#fefefe
| 0 ||  || MBA-I || 17.72 || data-sort-value="0.85" | 850 m || multiple || 2003–2021 || 16 Apr 2021 || 136 || align=left | Disc.: NEAT || 
|- id="2003 OA3" bgcolor=#FFC2E0
| 0 ||  || AMO || 19.66 || data-sort-value="0.42" | 420 m || multiple || 2003–2020 || 10 Dec 2020 || 206 || align=left | Disc.: NEAT || 
|- id="2003 OC3" bgcolor=#FFC2E0
| 0 ||  || APO || 18.8 || data-sort-value="0.62" | 620 m || multiple || 2003–2020 || 30 Jun 2020 || 210 || align=left | Disc.: NEATPotentially hazardous object || 
|- id="2003 OF3" bgcolor=#fefefe
| 0 ||  || MBA-I || 17.79 || 1.5 km || multiple || 2003–2020 || 22 Aug 2020 || 157 || align=left | Disc.: NEAT || 
|- id="2003 OH3" bgcolor=#fefefe
| 0 ||  || MBA-I || 16.97 || 1.2 km || multiple || 2002–2021 || 27 Nov 2021 || 263 || align=left | Disc.: AMOSAlt.: 2010 HW11 || 
|- id="2003 OB4" bgcolor=#FA8072
| 0 ||  || MCA || 19.5 || data-sort-value="0.70" | 700 m || multiple || 2003–2018 || 05 Oct 2018 || 294 || align=left | Disc.: NEAT || 
|- id="2003 OX5" bgcolor=#FA8072
| 1 ||  || MCA || 20.0 || data-sort-value="0.42" | 420 m || multiple || 2003–2016 || 07 Nov 2016 || 70 || align=left | Disc.: NEAT || 
|- id="2003 OH6" bgcolor=#E9E9E9
| 0 ||  || MBA-M || 17.6 || 1.3 km || multiple || 2003–2020 || 06 Dec 2020 || 133 || align=left | Disc.: CINEOS || 
|- id="2003 OQ6" bgcolor=#E9E9E9
| 0 ||  || MBA-M || 17.8 || 1.2 km || multiple || 2003–2021 || 06 Jan 2021 || 100 || align=left | Disc.: NEATAdded on 24 August 2020Alt.: 2016 NQ || 
|- id="2003 OX7" bgcolor=#FA8072
| 1 ||  || MCA || 19.0 || data-sort-value="0.47" | 470 m || multiple || 2003–2020 || 09 Dec 2020 || 198 || align=left | Disc.: NEAT || 
|- id="2003 OE11" bgcolor=#FA8072
| 2 ||  || MCA || 19.2 || data-sort-value="0.43" | 430 m || multiple || 2003–2014 || 07 Jan 2014 || 136 || align=left | Disc.: NEAT || 
|- id="2003 OW11" bgcolor=#E9E9E9
| 0 ||  || MBA-M || 16.53 || 1.5 km || multiple || 2003–2022 || 10 Jan 2022 || 179 || align=left | Disc.: NEAT || 
|- id="2003 OW12" bgcolor=#E9E9E9
| 0 ||  || MBA-M || 17.12 || 1.6 km || multiple || 2003–2021 || 04 Dec 2021 || 133 || align=left | Disc.: LINEAR || 
|- id="2003 OT13" bgcolor=#FFC2E0
| 2 ||  || APO || 23.3 || data-sort-value="0.078" | 78 m || multiple || 2003–2018 || 22 Jan 2018 || 129 || align=left | Disc.: LINEAR || 
|- id="2003 OU13" bgcolor=#FA8072
| 2 ||  || MCA || 18.7 || data-sort-value="0.76" | 760 m || multiple || 2003–2020 || 27 Jul 2020 || 34 || align=left | Disc.: NEATAlt.: 2020 NW || 
|- id="2003 OO14" bgcolor=#E9E9E9
| 1 ||  || MBA-M || 17.2 || 2.0 km || multiple || 2003–2018 || 14 Jan 2018 || 155 || align=left | Disc.: NEAT || 
|- id="2003 OZ14" bgcolor=#E9E9E9
| 0 ||  || MBA-M || 17.1 || 1.1 km || multiple || 2003–2020 || 08 Dec 2020 || 161 || align=left | Disc.: NEAT || 
|- id="2003 OG15" bgcolor=#d6d6d6
| 0 ||  || MBA-O || 16.3 || 3.1 km || multiple || 2003–2021 || 06 Jan 2021 || 138 || align=left | Disc.: Wise Obs. || 
|- id="2003 OX16" bgcolor=#FA8072
| 1 ||  || MCA || 18.6 || data-sort-value="0.57" | 570 m || multiple || 2003–2020 || 11 May 2020 || 185 || align=left | Disc.: LINEAR || 
|- id="2003 OY16" bgcolor=#FA8072
| 3 ||  || MCA || 19.4 || data-sort-value="0.39" | 390 m || multiple || 2003–2018 || 17 Jan 2018 || 27 || align=left | Disc.: LINEAR || 
|- id="2003 OG17" bgcolor=#fefefe
| 0 ||  || MBA-I || 17.97 || data-sort-value="0.76" | 760 m || multiple || 2003–2021 || 15 Apr 2021 || 83 || align=left | Disc.: CINEOS || 
|- id="2003 OJ17" bgcolor=#E9E9E9
| 0 ||  || MBA-M || 17.2 || 1.1 km || multiple || 2003–2021 || 15 Jan 2021 || 155 || align=left | Disc.: CINEOS || 
|- id="2003 OK18" bgcolor=#E9E9E9
| 1 ||  || MBA-M || 17.8 || 1.2 km || multiple || 2003–2020 || 16 Aug 2020 || 61 || align=left | Disc.: NEAT || 
|- id="2003 OQ18" bgcolor=#d6d6d6
| 0 ||  || MBA-O || 16.3 || 3.1 km || multiple || 2003–2021 || 16 Jan 2021 || 141 || align=left | Disc.: NEAT || 
|- id="2003 OE19" bgcolor=#d6d6d6
| 0 ||  || MBA-O || 16.8 || 2.4 km || multiple || 2003–2021 || 05 Jan 2021 || 71 || align=left | Disc.: NEAT || 
|- id="2003 OJ21" bgcolor=#E9E9E9
| 0 ||  || MBA-M || 16.4 || 1.6 km || multiple || 1953–2021 || 15 Jan 2021 || 342 || align=left | Disc.: LINEAR || 
|- id="2003 OQ24" bgcolor=#E9E9E9
| 0 ||  || MBA-M || 17.72 || 1.6 km || multiple || 2003–2021 || 08 Aug 2021 || 45 || align=left | Disc.: NEAT || 
|- id="2003 OD25" bgcolor=#d6d6d6
| 0 ||  || MBA-O || 17.1 || 2.1 km || multiple || 2003–2019 || 30 Sep 2019 || 65 || align=left | Disc.: NEAT || 
|- id="2003 OD26" bgcolor=#d6d6d6
| 0 ||  || MBA-O || 16.7 || 2.5 km || multiple || 2003–2020 || 07 Dec 2020 || 141 || align=left | Disc.: NEATAlt.: 2015 XN270 || 
|- id="2003 OG30" bgcolor=#E9E9E9
| 0 ||  || MBA-M || 17.0 || 1.7 km || multiple || 2003–2021 || 13 Jan 2021 || 205 || align=left | Disc.: NEAT || 
|- id="2003 OS33" bgcolor=#C2E0FF
| 5 ||  || TNO || 7.5 || 119 km || multiple || 2003–2004 || 06 Nov 2004 || 25 || align=left | Disc.: Mauna Kea Obs.LoUTNOs, SDO || 
|- id="2003 OV33" bgcolor=#d6d6d6
| 9 ||  || MBA-O || 18.22 || 1.3 km || single || 1 day || 01 Aug 2003 || 10 || align=left | Disc.: Mauna Kea Obs.Added on 21 August 2021 || 
|- id="2003 OW33" bgcolor=#d6d6d6
| 9 ||  || MBA-O || 19.04 || data-sort-value="0.87" | 870 m || single || 1 day || 01 Aug 2003 || 11 || align=left | Disc.: Mauna Kea Obs.Added on 21 August 2021 || 
|- id="2003 OX33" bgcolor=#E9E9E9
| 9 ||  || MBA-M || 20.42 || data-sort-value="0.46" | 460 m || single || 1 day || 01 Aug 2003 || 10 || align=left | Disc.: Mauna Kea Obs.Added on 21 August 2021 || 
|- id="2003 OA34" bgcolor=#d6d6d6
| 0 ||  || MBA-O || 16.58 || 2.7 km || multiple || 2003–2021 || 11 May 2021 || 130 || align=left | Disc.: Mauna Kea Obs.Alt.: 2018 NK12 || 
|- id="2003 OB34" bgcolor=#fefefe
| 9 ||  || MBA-I || 21.23 || data-sort-value="0.17" | 170 m || single || 1 day || 01 Aug 2003 || 10 || align=left | Disc.: Mauna Kea Obs.Added on 21 August 2021 || 
|- id="2003 OE34" bgcolor=#E9E9E9
| 0 ||  || MBA-M || 17.6 || 1.7 km || multiple || 2003–2020 || 25 May 2020 || 44 || align=left | Disc.: Mauna Kea Obs. || 
|- id="2003 OF34" bgcolor=#d6d6d6
| – ||  || MBA-O || 17.7 || 1.6 km || single || 23 days || 23 Aug 2003 || 12 || align=left | Disc.: Mauna Kea Obs. || 
|- id="2003 OG34" bgcolor=#E9E9E9
| 1 ||  || MBA-M || 18.7 || data-sort-value="0.76" | 760 m || multiple || 2003–2020 || 17 Sep 2020 || 48 || align=left | Disc.: Mauna Kea Obs. || 
|- id="2003 OM34" bgcolor=#E9E9E9
| 0 ||  || MBA-M || 18.3 || data-sort-value="0.92" | 920 m || multiple || 2003–2022 || 27 Jan 2022 || 55 || align=left | Disc.: Mauna Kea Obs.Added on 29 January 2022 || 
|- id="2003 OS34" bgcolor=#fefefe
| 0 ||  || MBA-I || 17.99 || data-sort-value="0.75" | 750 m || multiple || 1994–2021 || 11 May 2021 || 195 || align=left | Disc.: NEAT || 
|- id="2003 OT34" bgcolor=#E9E9E9
| 0 ||  || MBA-M || 17.00 || 1.7 km || multiple || 2003–2021 || 30 Oct 2021 || 301 || align=left | Disc.: NEAT || 
|- id="2003 OU34" bgcolor=#E9E9E9
| 0 ||  || MBA-M || 16.4 || 2.9 km || multiple || 2003–2020 || 27 Apr 2020 || 142 || align=left | Disc.: NEAT || 
|- id="2003 OV34" bgcolor=#E9E9E9
| 0 ||  || MBA-M || 17.2 || 1.1 km || multiple || 2003–2021 || 13 Jan 2021 || 137 || align=left | Disc.: NEAT || 
|- id="2003 OW34" bgcolor=#E9E9E9
| 0 ||  || MBA-M || 17.39 || data-sort-value="0.99" | 990 m || multiple || 2003–2022 || 26 Jan 2022 || 104 || align=left | Disc.: NEAT || 
|- id="2003 OX34" bgcolor=#E9E9E9
| 0 ||  || MBA-M || 17.0 || 1.2 km || multiple || 2003–2021 || 06 Jan 2021 || 138 || align=left | Disc.: NEAT || 
|- id="2003 OY34" bgcolor=#fefefe
| 0 ||  || MBA-I || 18.44 || data-sort-value="0.61" | 610 m || multiple || 2003–2021 || 10 Aug 2021 || 83 || align=left | Disc.: Cerro Tololo || 
|- id="2003 OZ34" bgcolor=#fefefe
| 1 ||  || MBA-I || 18.5 || data-sort-value="0.59" | 590 m || multiple || 2003–2018 || 13 Dec 2018 || 54 || align=left | Disc.: CINEOS || 
|- id="2003 OA35" bgcolor=#E9E9E9
| 0 ||  || MBA-M || 17.2 || 1.5 km || multiple || 2003–2020 || 16 Nov 2020 || 129 || align=left | Disc.: NEAT || 
|- id="2003 OB35" bgcolor=#fefefe
| 0 ||  || MBA-I || 18.4 || data-sort-value="0.62" | 620 m || multiple || 2003–2019 || 19 Sep 2019 || 72 || align=left | Disc.: NEAT || 
|- id="2003 OC35" bgcolor=#E9E9E9
| 0 ||  || MBA-M || 16.9 || 2.3 km || multiple || 2003–2017 || 10 Oct 2017 || 47 || align=left | Disc.: NEAT || 
|- id="2003 OD35" bgcolor=#E9E9E9
| 0 ||  || MBA-M || 17.55 || data-sort-value="0.92" | 920 m || multiple || 2003–2022 || 27 Jan 2022 || 94 || align=left | Disc.: NEAT || 
|- id="2003 OH35" bgcolor=#fefefe
| 0 ||  || MBA-I || 18.3 || data-sort-value="0.65" | 650 m || multiple || 2003–2014 || 30 May 2014 || 24 || align=left | Disc.: NEAT || 
|- id="2003 OJ35" bgcolor=#E9E9E9
| 1 ||  || MBA-M || 17.4 || data-sort-value="0.98" | 980 m || multiple || 2003–2021 || 14 Jan 2021 || 46 || align=left | Disc.: Cerro Tololo || 
|- id="2003 OK35" bgcolor=#E9E9E9
| 0 ||  || MBA-M || 16.7 || 1.4 km || multiple || 2003–2021 || 15 Jan 2021 || 193 || align=left | Disc.: NEAT || 
|- id="2003 OL35" bgcolor=#E9E9E9
| 0 ||  || MBA-M || 16.9 || 1.2 km || multiple || 2003–2020 || 16 Nov 2020 || 119 || align=left | Disc.: NEAT || 
|- id="2003 ON35" bgcolor=#fefefe
| 0 ||  || HUN || 18.3 || data-sort-value="0.65" | 650 m || multiple || 2003–2021 || 16 Jan 2021 || 55 || align=left | Disc.: NEAT || 
|- id="2003 OQ35" bgcolor=#d6d6d6
| 0 ||  || MBA-O || 16.29 || 3.1 km || multiple || 2003–2022 || 24 Jan 2022 || 96 || align=left | Disc.: NEAT || 
|- id="2003 OR35" bgcolor=#E9E9E9
| 0 ||  || MBA-M || 16.7 || 1.4 km || multiple || 2003–2021 || 11 Jan 2021 || 127 || align=left | Disc.: NEAT || 
|- id="2003 OS35" bgcolor=#fefefe
| 1 ||  || MBA-I || 18.0 || data-sort-value="0.75" | 750 m || multiple || 2003–2020 || 07 Dec 2020 || 163 || align=left | Disc.: NEATAlt.: 2010 NW102 || 
|- id="2003 OT35" bgcolor=#FA8072
| 0 ||  || MCA || 18.58 || data-sort-value="0.57" | 570 m || multiple || 2003–2022 || 27 Jan 2022 || 125 || align=left | Disc.: NEATAdded on 22 July 2020 || 
|- id="2003 OU35" bgcolor=#E9E9E9
| 0 ||  || MBA-M || 17.14 || 1.1 km || multiple || 1999–2022 || 26 Jan 2022 || 106 || align=left | Disc.: NEATAdded on 19 October 2020 || 
|- id="2003 OV35" bgcolor=#E9E9E9
| 1 ||  || MBA-M || 17.4 || data-sort-value="0.98" | 980 m || multiple || 2003–2021 || 07 Feb 2021 || 53 || align=left | Disc.: NEATAdded on 17 January 2021Alt.: 2020 WA10 || 
|}
back to top

P 

|- id="2003 PN" bgcolor=#E9E9E9
| 0 || 2003 PN || MBA-M || 17.3 || 1.0 km || multiple || 2003–2021 || 13 Jan 2021 || 145 || align=left | Disc.: AMOS || 
|- id="2003 PQ" bgcolor=#fefefe
| 0 || 2003 PQ || MBA-I || 18.33 || data-sort-value="0.64" | 640 m || multiple || 2003–2021 || 01 May 2021 || 92 || align=left | Disc.: KLENOT || 
|- id="2003 PF3" bgcolor=#E9E9E9
| 0 ||  || MBA-M || 18.42 || data-sort-value="0.87" | 870 m || multiple || 2003–2021 || 25 Nov 2021 || 44 || align=left | Disc.: AMOS || 
|- id="2003 PV3" bgcolor=#d6d6d6
| 0 ||  || MBA-O || 16.4 || 2.9 km || multiple || 2003–2021 || 17 Jan 2021 || 176 || align=left | Disc.: AMOS || 
|- id="2003 PL4" bgcolor=#FA8072
| 1 ||  || MCA || 18.6 || data-sort-value="0.57" | 570 m || multiple || 2003–2019 || 01 Nov 2019 || 84 || align=left | Disc.: Reedy Creek Obs. || 
|- id="2003 PU4" bgcolor=#E9E9E9
| 0 ||  || MBA-M || 17.3 || 1.5 km || multiple || 2002–2020 || 18 Oct 2020 || 125 || align=left | Disc.: AMOS || 
|- id="2003 PM5" bgcolor=#FA8072
| – ||  || MCA || 19.9 || data-sort-value="0.31" | 310 m || single || 1 day || 05 Aug 2003 || 42 || align=left | Disc.: LINEAR || 
|- id="2003 PN5" bgcolor=#FFC2E0
| 5 ||  || AMO || 23.2 || data-sort-value="0.081" | 81 m || single || 83 days || 26 Oct 2003 || 37 || align=left | Disc.: LINEAR || 
|- id="2003 PL10" bgcolor=#fefefe
| 0 ||  || MBA-I || 18.06 || data-sort-value="0.73" | 730 m || multiple || 2003–2021 || 31 Mar 2021 || 96 || align=left | Disc.: SpacewatchAlt.: 2006 DJ162 || 
|- id="2003 PN10" bgcolor=#E9E9E9
| 0 ||  || MBA-M || 18.1 || data-sort-value="0.71" | 710 m || multiple || 2003–2020 || 24 Oct 2020 || 63 || align=left | Disc.: Spacewatch || 
|- id="2003 PS10" bgcolor=#fefefe
| 1 ||  || HUN || 19.2 || data-sort-value="0.43" | 430 m || multiple || 2003–2019 || 05 Aug 2019 || 23 || align=left | Disc.: SpacewatchAdded on 24 December 2021 || 
|- id="2003 PW10" bgcolor=#E9E9E9
| 0 ||  || MBA-M || 17.8 || 1.2 km || multiple || 2003–2021 || 29 Oct 2021 || 55 || align=left | Disc.: SpacewatchAdded on 29 January 2022 || 
|- id="2003 PY10" bgcolor=#FA8072
| 5 ||  || MCA || 19.6 || data-sort-value="0.67" | 670 m || single || 44 days || 18 Sep 2003 || 54 || align=left | Disc.: LINEAR || 
|- id="2003 PB11" bgcolor=#FA8072
| 1 ||  || MCA || 19.03 || data-sort-value="0.46" | 460 m || multiple || 2000–2021 || 01 May 2021 || 103 || align=left | Disc.: LINEARAlt.: 2000 QC166 || 
|- id="2003 PX12" bgcolor=#E9E9E9
| 0 ||  || MBA-M || 18.25 || 1.2 km || multiple || 2003–2021 || 01 Nov 2021 || 99 || align=left | Disc.: Spacewatch || 
|- id="2003 PF13" bgcolor=#E9E9E9
| 0 ||  || MBA-M || 17.03 || 1.2 km || multiple || 2003–2022 || 25 Jan 2022 || 139 || align=left | Disc.: Spacewatch || 
|- id="2003 PG13" bgcolor=#E9E9E9
| 0 ||  || MBA-M || 16.7 || 2.5 km || multiple || 2003–2021 || 10 Jun 2021 || 125 || align=left | Disc.: Spacewatch || 
|- id="2003 PH13" bgcolor=#fefefe
| 0 ||  || MBA-I || 17.9 || data-sort-value="0.78" | 780 m || multiple || 2003–2021 || 06 Jan 2021 || 81 || align=left | Disc.: Spacewatch || 
|- id="2003 PK13" bgcolor=#fefefe
| 0 ||  || MBA-I || 18.8 || data-sort-value="0.52" | 520 m || multiple || 2003–2020 || 12 Sep 2020 || 60 || align=left | Disc.: Spacewatch || 
|- id="2003 PM13" bgcolor=#fefefe
| 0 ||  || MBA-I || 18.3 || data-sort-value="0.65" | 650 m || multiple || 2003–2020 || 21 Jun 2020 || 70 || align=left | Disc.: Spacewatch || 
|- id="2003 PN13" bgcolor=#d6d6d6
| 0 ||  || MBA-O || 16.9 || 2.3 km || multiple || 2001–2019 || 25 Oct 2019 || 53 || align=left | Disc.: Spacewatch || 
|- id="2003 PO13" bgcolor=#fefefe
| 0 ||  || MBA-I || 18.3 || data-sort-value="0.65" | 650 m || multiple || 1995–2021 || 15 Jan 2021 || 49 || align=left | Disc.: SpacewatchAlt.: 1995 CF3 || 
|- id="2003 PP13" bgcolor=#d6d6d6
| 0 ||  || MBA-O || 17.10 || 2.1 km || multiple || 2003–2022 || 25 Jan 2022 || 86 || align=left | Disc.: Spacewatch || 
|- id="2003 PQ13" bgcolor=#fefefe
| 1 ||  || MBA-I || 18.7 || data-sort-value="0.54" | 540 m || multiple || 2003–2018 || 12 Jul 2018 || 33 || align=left | Disc.: SpacewatchAdded on 22 July 2020 || 
|- id="2003 PS13" bgcolor=#d6d6d6
| 1 ||  || MBA-O || 16.4 || 2.9 km || multiple || 2003–2020 || 14 Dec 2020 || 110 || align=left | Disc.: AMOSAdded on 19 October 2020Alt.: 2010 AD132 || 
|- id="2003 PU13" bgcolor=#FA8072
| 1 ||  || MCA || 18.84 || data-sort-value="0.51" | 510 m || multiple || 2000–2021 || 09 Apr 2021 || 40 || align=left | Disc.: SpacewatchAdded on 11 May 2021 || 
|- id="2003 PV13" bgcolor=#fefefe
| 0 ||  || MBA-I || 19.19 || data-sort-value="0.43" | 430 m || multiple || 2003–2021 || 13 Sep 2021 || 47 || align=left | Disc.: SpacewatchAdded on 21 August 2021 || 
|- id="2003 PW13" bgcolor=#E9E9E9
| 1 ||  || MBA-M || 18.49 || 1.1 km || multiple || 2003–2021 || 11 Oct 2021 || 31 || align=left | Disc.: No observationsAdded on 30 September 2021 || 
|}
back to top

Q 

|- id="2003 QA" bgcolor=#FFC2E0
| 0 || 2003 QA || APO || 18.49 || data-sort-value="0.71" | 710 m || multiple || 2003–2021 || 31 Oct 2021 || 434 || align=left | Disc.: Mallorca Obs. || 
|- id="2003 QC" bgcolor=#FFC2E0
| 4 || 2003 QC || AMO || 20.8 || data-sort-value="0.25" | 250 m || single || 87 days || 13 Nov 2003 || 187 || align=left | Disc.: AMOS || 
|- id="2003 QR" bgcolor=#fefefe
| 0 || 2003 QR || MBA-I || 18.1 || data-sort-value="0.71" | 710 m || multiple || 2003–2020 || 18 Jul 2020 || 100 || align=left | Disc.: CINEOS || 
|- id="2003 QX" bgcolor=#E9E9E9
| 1 || 2003 QX || MBA-M || 17.4 || data-sort-value="0.98" | 980 m || multiple || 2003–2020 || 10 Dec 2020 || 109 || align=left | Disc.: Pla D'Arguines Obs. || 
|- id="2003 QA1" bgcolor=#E9E9E9
| 0 ||  || MBA-M || 17.49 || 1.8 km || multiple || 2003–2021 || 26 Oct 2021 || 56 || align=left | Disc.: NEAT || 
|- id="2003 QL3" bgcolor=#fefefe
| 0 ||  || MBA-I || 17.95 || data-sort-value="0.76" | 760 m || multiple || 2003–2021 || 15 May 2021 || 106 || align=left | Disc.: CINEOS || 
|- id="2003 QM3" bgcolor=#d6d6d6
| 0 ||  || MBA-O || 16.9 || 2.3 km || multiple || 2003–2020 || 12 Dec 2020 || 72 || align=left | Disc.: CINEOSAlt.: 2014 WS194 || 
|- id="2003 QA4" bgcolor=#fefefe
| 0 ||  || MBA-I || 17.94 || data-sort-value="0.77" | 770 m || multiple || 2003–2021 || 09 Dec 2021 || 194 || align=left | Disc.: AMOSAlt.: 2017 OJ2 || 
|- id="2003 QC4" bgcolor=#E9E9E9
| 0 ||  || MBA-M || 17.3 || 1.5 km || multiple || 2003–2021 || 05 Jan 2021 || 227 || align=left | Disc.: CINEOSAlt.: 2016 UN47 || 
|- id="2003 QK5" bgcolor=#FFC2E0
| 5 ||  || AMO || 22.6 || data-sort-value="0.11" | 110 m || single || 66 days || 26 Oct 2003 || 41 || align=left | Disc.: NEAT || 
|- id="2003 QU5" bgcolor=#FFC2E0
| 7 ||  || APO || 24.2 || data-sort-value="0.051" | 51 m || single || 9 days || 30 Aug 2003 || 52 || align=left | Disc.: LINEAR || 
|- id="2003 QM9" bgcolor=#fefefe
| 0 ||  || MBA-I || 18.2 || data-sort-value="0.68" | 680 m || multiple || 2003–2019 || 02 Jun 2019 || 97 || align=left | Disc.: CINEOS || 
|- id="2003 QR9" bgcolor=#FA8072
| 0 ||  || MCA || 18.9 || data-sort-value="0.49" | 490 m || multiple || 2003–2019 || 06 Jul 2019 || 95 || align=left | Disc.: NEAT || 
|- id="2003 QB10" bgcolor=#FA8072
| – ||  || MCA || 19.0 || data-sort-value="0.67" | 670 m || single || 25 days || 16 Sep 2003 || 28 || align=left | Disc.: NEAT || 
|- id="2003 QO10" bgcolor=#d6d6d6
| 0 ||  || MBA-O || 17.0 || 2.2 km || multiple || 2003–2020 || 10 Dec 2020 || 51 || align=left | Disc.: KLENOT || 
|- id="2003 QQ10" bgcolor=#FFC2E0
| 1 ||  || AMO || 19.5 || data-sort-value="0.45" | 450 m || multiple || 2003–2020 || 11 Dec 2020 || 262 || align=left | Disc.: NEAT || 
|- id="2003 QZ12" bgcolor=#FA8072
| 0 ||  || MCA || 16.9 || 1.8 km || multiple || 1951–2020 || 22 Aug 2020 || 259 || align=left | Disc.: NEAT || 
|- id="2003 QR14" bgcolor=#fefefe
| 0 ||  || MBA-I || 17.81 || data-sort-value="0.81" | 810 m || multiple || 2003–2021 || 25 Nov 2021 || 141 || align=left | Disc.: NEATAlt.: 2010 TE128, 2014 UP142, 2016 CL119 || 
|- id="2003 QV15" bgcolor=#fefefe
| 1 ||  || MBA-I || 17.1 || 1.1 km || multiple || 2003–2020 || 11 May 2020 || 225 || align=left | Disc.: NEAT || 
|- id="2003 QL16" bgcolor=#d6d6d6
| 0 ||  || MBA-O || 16.8 || 2.4 km || multiple || 2003–2019 || 26 Nov 2019 || 107 || align=left | Disc.: CINEOSAlt.: 2014 UL109 || 
|- id="2003 QN19" bgcolor=#E9E9E9
| 0 ||  || MBA-M || 17.4 || data-sort-value="0.98" | 980 m || multiple || 2003–2021 || 18 Jan 2021 || 176 || align=left | Disc.: AMOSAlt.: 2013 BJ77 || 
|- id="2003 QH23" bgcolor=#fefefe
| 0 ||  || MBA-I || 17.9 || data-sort-value="0.78" | 780 m || multiple || 2003–2019 || 01 Jul 2019 || 123 || align=left | Disc.: NEAT || 
|- id="2003 QE28" bgcolor=#FA8072
| 0 ||  || MCA || 18.9 || data-sort-value="0.49" | 490 m || multiple || 2003–2020 || 11 Oct 2020 || 70 || align=left | Disc.: Saint-Sulpice Obs.Alt.: 2020 MH12 || 
|- id="2003 QL28" bgcolor=#fefefe
| 0 ||  || MBA-I || 18.12 || data-sort-value="0.71" | 710 m || multiple || 2000–2021 || 08 May 2021 || 151 || align=left | Disc.: NEAT || 
|- id="2003 QM28" bgcolor=#fefefe
| 0 ||  || MBA-I || 18.6 || data-sort-value="0.57" | 570 m || multiple || 2003–2020 || 14 Nov 2020 || 74 || align=left | Disc.: NEAT || 
|- id="2003 QO28" bgcolor=#E9E9E9
| 0 ||  || MBA-M || 16.76 || 1.9 km || multiple || 2003–2022 || 06 Jan 2022 || 301 || align=left | Disc.: NEAT || 
|- id="2003 QR28" bgcolor=#fefefe
| 0 ||  || MBA-I || 18.29 || data-sort-value="0.65" | 650 m || multiple || 2003–2021 || 09 Jul 2021 || 109 || align=left | Disc.: NEATAlt.: 2007 TX8 || 
|- id="2003 QV28" bgcolor=#E9E9E9
| 0 ||  || MBA-M || 17.7 || 1.2 km || multiple || 2003–2018 || 15 Jan 2018 || 56 || align=left | Disc.: CINEOS || 
|- id="2003 QX28" bgcolor=#E9E9E9
| 1 ||  || MBA-M || 17.9 || data-sort-value="0.78" | 780 m || multiple || 1999–2021 || 18 Jan 2021 || 66 || align=left | Disc.: NEAT || 
|- id="2003 QD29" bgcolor=#FA8072
| 1 ||  || MCA || 19.2 || data-sort-value="0.43" | 430 m || multiple || 2003–2020 || 22 Jun 2020 || 47 || align=left | Disc.: NEAT || 
|- id="2003 QF29" bgcolor=#E9E9E9
| 4 ||  || MBA-M || 17.8 || data-sort-value="0.82" | 820 m || multiple || 2003–2007 || 14 Aug 2007 || 15 || align=left | Disc.: NEATAdded on 21 August 2021Alt.: 2007 OW9 || 
|- id="2003 QH29" bgcolor=#E9E9E9
| 1 ||  || MBA-M || 18.35 || data-sort-value="0.64" | 640 m || multiple || 1999–2019 || 02 Jun 2019 || 36 || align=left | Disc.: NEAT || 
|- id="2003 QP29" bgcolor=#E9E9E9
| 0 ||  || MBA-M || 17.9 || 1.1 km || multiple || 2002–2020 || 21 Jul 2020 || 99 || align=left | Disc.: Piszkéstető Stn. || 
|- id="2003 QY29" bgcolor=#FFC2E0
| 5 ||  || AMO || 22.3 || data-sort-value="0.12" | 120 m || single || 28 days || 20 Sep 2003 || 62 || align=left | Disc.: LINEAR || 
|- id="2003 QZ29" bgcolor=#FFC2E0
| 0 ||  || APO || 19.0 || data-sort-value="0.56" | 560 m || multiple || 2003–2012 || 19 Feb 2012 || 224 || align=left | Disc.: LINEAR || 
|- id="2003 QA30" bgcolor=#FFC2E0
| 0 ||  || AMO || 21.75 || data-sort-value="0.16" | 160 m || multiple || 2003–2021 || 03 Oct 2021 || 87 || align=left | Disc.: LINEAR || 
|- id="2003 QB30" bgcolor=#FFC2E0
| 6 ||  || APO || 26.8 || data-sort-value="0.016" | 16 m || single || 3 days || 27 Aug 2003 || 29 || align=left | Disc.: LINEAR || 
|- id="2003 QY30" bgcolor=#FA8072
| – ||  || MCA || 17.6 || 1.3 km || single || 26 days || 20 Sep 2003 || 87 || align=left | Disc.: AMOS || 
|- id="2003 QB31" bgcolor=#FFC2E0
| 4 ||  || AMO || 21.6 || data-sort-value="0.17" | 170 m || single || 65 days || 29 Oct 2003 || 41 || align=left | Disc.: NEAT || 
|- id="2003 QF31" bgcolor=#d6d6d6
| 0 ||  || MBA-O || 16.8 || 2.4 km || multiple || 2003–2019 || 01 Nov 2019 || 69 || align=left | Disc.: Piszkéstető Stn.Alt.: 2003 SZ126 || 
|- id="2003 QS31" bgcolor=#E9E9E9
| 1 ||  || MBA-M || 17.2 || 1.1 km || multiple || 1999–2016 || 24 Dec 2016 || 56 || align=left | Disc.: NEAT || 
|- id="2003 QV32" bgcolor=#E9E9E9
| 0 ||  || MBA-M || 17.3 || 1.0 km || multiple || 2003–2021 || 11 Jan 2021 || 172 || align=left | Disc.: CINEOS || 
|- id="2003 QC34" bgcolor=#E9E9E9
| 0 ||  || MBA-M || 17.66 || 1.2 km || multiple || 2003–2022 || 25 Jan 2022 || 157 || align=left | Disc.: NEAT || 
|- id="2003 QT34" bgcolor=#E9E9E9
| 0 ||  || MBA-M || 17.9 || 1.1 km || multiple || 2003–2020 || 13 Nov 2020 || 105 || align=left | Disc.: NEAT || 
|- id="2003 QW34" bgcolor=#E9E9E9
| 0 ||  || MBA-M || 17.07 || 2.1 km || multiple || 1994–2021 || 05 Oct 2021 || 208 || align=left | Disc.: NEATAlt.: 2012 PF15 || 
|- id="2003 QL36" bgcolor=#fefefe
| 0 ||  || MBA-I || 18.50 || data-sort-value="0.59" | 590 m || multiple || 2003–2021 || 06 Nov 2021 || 105 || align=left | Disc.: NEAT || 
|- id="2003 QN36" bgcolor=#E9E9E9
| 0 ||  || MBA-M || 17.6 || data-sort-value="0.90" | 900 m || multiple || 2003–2021 || 18 Jan 2021 || 87 || align=left | Disc.: NEAT || 
|- id="2003 QX42" bgcolor=#d6d6d6
| 0 ||  || MBA-O || 16.8 || 2.4 km || multiple || 2003–2020 || 03 Jan 2020 || 53 || align=left | Disc.: NEAT || 
|- id="2003 QC43" bgcolor=#d6d6d6
| 0 ||  || MBA-O || 16.6 || 2.7 km || multiple || 2003–2020 || 15 Feb 2020 || 220 || align=left | Disc.: NEAT || 
|- id="2003 QT43" bgcolor=#fefefe
| 0 ||  || MBA-I || 17.5 || data-sort-value="0.94" | 940 m || multiple || 2003–2020 || 22 Nov 2020 || 189 || align=left | Disc.: AMOS || 
|- id="2003 QN45" bgcolor=#d6d6d6
| 0 ||  || MBA-O || 15.41 || 4.6 km || multiple || 2002–2021 || 05 Dec 2021 || 297 || align=left | Disc.: NEATAlt.: 2012 CD32 || 
|- id="2003 QP47" bgcolor=#FA8072
| 1 ||  || MCA || 18.9 || data-sort-value="0.49" | 490 m || multiple || 2003–2013 || 13 Dec 2013 || 47 || align=left | Disc.: NEAT || 
|- id="2003 QW47" bgcolor=#E9E9E9
| 0 ||  || MBA-M || 16.81 || 2.4 km || multiple || 2001–2021 || 31 Oct 2021 || 175 || align=left | Disc.: NEAT || 
|- id="2003 QN49" bgcolor=#fefefe
| 0 ||  || MBA-I || 18.0 || data-sort-value="0.75" | 750 m || multiple || 2003–2016 || 03 Jan 2016 || 52 || align=left | Disc.: NEAT || 
|- id="2003 QM50" bgcolor=#FA8072
| 0 ||  || MCA || 17.3 || 1.0 km || multiple || 2003–2020 || 16 Nov 2020 || 138 || align=left | Disc.: NEATAlt.: 2011 HR30 || 
|- id="2003 QQ56" bgcolor=#E9E9E9
| 2 ||  || MBA-M || 17.4 || data-sort-value="0.98" | 980 m || multiple || 2003–2019 || 10 Jul 2019 || 77 || align=left | Disc.: LINEARAlt.: 2007 PF10 || 
|- id="2003 QM58" bgcolor=#E9E9E9
| 1 ||  || MBA-M || 17.4 || data-sort-value="0.98" | 980 m || multiple || 1995–2019 || 27 Oct 2019 || 133 || align=left | Disc.: NEATAlt.: 2018 FW10 || 
|- id="2003 QL65" bgcolor=#d6d6d6
| 0 ||  || MBA-O || 16.60 || 2.7 km || multiple || 2003–2022 || 26 Jan 2022 || 198 || align=left | Disc.: NEATAlt.: 2010 BN104 || 
|- id="2003 QW66" bgcolor=#fefefe
| 0 ||  || MBA-I || 17.52 || data-sort-value="0.93" | 930 m || multiple || 2003–2021 || 22 May 2021 || 179 || align=left | Disc.: NEATAlt.: 2005 CE63 || 
|- id="2003 QQ68" bgcolor=#FA8072
| 0 ||  || MCA || 18.0 || data-sort-value="0.75" | 750 m || multiple || 2003–2021 || 18 Jan 2021 || 112 || align=left | Disc.: LINEAR || 
|- id="2003 QG69" bgcolor=#d6d6d6
| 0 ||  || MBA-O || 17.2 || 2.0 km || multiple || 2003–2021 || 14 Jan 2021 || 42 || align=left | Disc.: NEATAdded on 17 June 2021Alt.: 2020 YU13 || 
|- id="2003 QM69" bgcolor=#E9E9E9
| 0 ||  || MBA-M || 17.4 || data-sort-value="0.98" | 980 m || multiple || 2003–2021 || 14 Jan 2021 || 66 || align=left | Disc.: LINEAR || 
|- id="2003 QX69" bgcolor=#fefefe
| 0 ||  || MBA-I || 18.62 || data-sort-value="0.56" | 560 m || multiple || 2003–2021 || 15 Apr 2021 || 61 || align=left | Disc.: Piszkéstető Stn. || 
|- id="2003 QC70" bgcolor=#FA8072
| 4 ||  || MCA || 19.3 || data-sort-value="0.77" | 770 m || single || 61 days || 27 Oct 2003 || 42 || align=left | Disc.: NEAT || 
|- id="2003 QF70" bgcolor=#FFC2E0
| 1 ||  || AMO || 19.9 || data-sort-value="0.37" | 370 m || multiple || 2003–2014 || 10 Jan 2014 || 147 || align=left | Disc.: NEAT || 
|- id="2003 QW70" bgcolor=#fefefe
| 0 ||  || MBA-I || 17.72 || data-sort-value="0.85" | 850 m || multiple || 2003–2021 || 10 May 2021 || 97 || align=left | Disc.: NEAT || 
|- id="2003 QM71" bgcolor=#E9E9E9
| 0 ||  || MBA-M || 17.2 || 1.5 km || multiple || 2003–2020 || 03 Dec 2020 || 127 || align=left | Disc.: NEATAlt.: 2012 VJ104 || 
|- id="2003 QS72" bgcolor=#E9E9E9
| 0 ||  || MBA-M || 17.1 || 1.1 km || multiple || 2003–2021 || 08 Jan 2021 || 194 || align=left | Disc.: NEATAlt.: 2015 FN45 || 
|- id="2003 QY72" bgcolor=#fefefe
| 0 ||  || MBA-I || 17.98 || 2.0 km || multiple || 2003–2021 || 23 Nov 2021 || 187 || align=left | Disc.: LINEAR || 
|- id="2003 QR73" bgcolor=#d6d6d6
| 0 ||  || MBA-O || 16.4 || 2.9 km || multiple || 2003–2020 || 25 Sep 2020 || 130 || align=left | Disc.: Črni Vrh Obs.Alt.: 2014 NC43 || 
|- id="2003 QO74" bgcolor=#d6d6d6
| 0 ||  || MBA-O || 16.3 || 3.1 km || multiple || 2003–2020 || 19 Dec 2020 || 77 || align=left | Disc.: LINEAR || 
|- id="2003 QF76" bgcolor=#fefefe
| 0 ||  || MBA-I || 17.80 || data-sort-value="0.82" | 820 m || multiple || 2003–2021 || 21 Nov 2021 || 254 || align=left | Disc.: LINEAR || 
|- id="2003 QL80" bgcolor=#E9E9E9
| 0 ||  || MBA-M || 17.08 || 1.6 km || multiple || 2003–2022 || 25 Jan 2022 || 141 || align=left | Disc.: NEATAdded on 13 September 2020Alt.: 2012 SV29 || 
|- id="2003 QY80" bgcolor=#d6d6d6
| – ||  || MBA-O || 16.3 || 3.1 km || single || 8 days || 31 Aug 2003 || 7 || align=left | Disc.: Cerro Tololo || 
|- id="2003 QC81" bgcolor=#E9E9E9
| 0 ||  || MBA-M || 18.14 || data-sort-value="0.99" | 990 m || multiple || 1999–2021 || 25 Nov 2021 || 42 || align=left | Disc.: Cerro TololoAdded on 5 November 2021 || 
|- id="2003 QK81" bgcolor=#E9E9E9
| – ||  || MBA-M || 18.7 || data-sort-value="0.54" | 540 m || single || 14 days || 05 Sep 2003 || 7 || align=left | Disc.: Cerro Tololo || 
|- id="2003 QA82" bgcolor=#d6d6d6
| 0 ||  || MBA-O || 15.97 || 4.7 km || multiple || 2000–2022 || 25 Jan 2022 || 178 || align=left | Disc.: NEATAlt.: 2010 BA124, 2014 OT359 || 
|- id="2003 QD82" bgcolor=#fefefe
| 0 ||  || MBA-I || 18.50 || data-sort-value="0.59" | 590 m || multiple || 2003–2020 || 16 May 2020 || 27 || align=left | Disc.: Cerro TololoAdded on 17 June 2021Alt.: 2009 DJ57 || 
|- id="2003 QE82" bgcolor=#fefefe
| 0 ||  || MBA-I || 18.71 || data-sort-value="0.54" | 540 m || multiple || 2003–2021 || 12 Sep 2021 || 54 || align=left | Disc.: Cerro Tololo || 
|- id="2003 QN82" bgcolor=#d6d6d6
| 3 ||  || MBA-O || 17.81 || 1.4 km || multiple || 2003–2023 || 19 Mar 2023 || 22 || align=left | Disc.: Cerro Tololo || 
|- id="2003 QW82" bgcolor=#fefefe
| 0 ||  || MBA-I || 18.7 || data-sort-value="0.54" | 540 m || multiple || 2002–2021 || 13 Oct 2021 || 27 || align=left | Disc.: Cerro Tololo Obs.Added on 24 December 2021 || 
|- id="2003 QY82" bgcolor=#fefefe
| 2 ||  || MBA-I || 19.0 || data-sort-value="0.47" | 470 m || multiple || 2003–2021 || 08 May 2021 || 34 || align=left | Disc.: Cerro TololoAdded on 17 June 2021Alt.: 2021 GK40 || 
|- id="2003 QD83" bgcolor=#E9E9E9
| 1 ||  || MBA-M || 18.34 || 1.2 km || multiple || 2003–2021 || 05 Aug 2021 || 26 || align=left | Disc.: Cerro TololoAdded on 22 July 2020 || 
|- id="2003 QV83" bgcolor=#fefefe
| 0 ||  || MBA-I || 19.1 || data-sort-value="0.45" | 450 m || multiple || 2003–2019 || 01 May 2019 || 26 || align=left | Disc.: Cerro Tololo || 
|- id="2003 QX83" bgcolor=#d6d6d6
| E ||  || MBA-O || 18.3 || 1.2 km || single || 7 days || 31 Aug 2003 || 7 || align=left | Disc.: Cerro Tololo || 
|- id="2003 QY83" bgcolor=#d6d6d6
| – ||  || MBA-O || 17.9 || 1.5 km || single || 7 days || 31 Aug 2003 || 7 || align=left | Disc.: Cerro Tololo || 
|- id="2003 QA84" bgcolor=#E9E9E9
| 0 ||  || MBA-M || 18.09 || 1.3 km || multiple || 2003–2021 || 29 Sep 2021 || 42 || align=left | Disc.: Cerro TololoAdded on 30 September 2021 || 
|- id="2003 QD84" bgcolor=#d6d6d6
| – ||  || MBA-O || 18.7 || 1.0 km || single || 7 days || 31 Aug 2003 || 7 || align=left | Disc.: Cerro Tololo || 
|- id="2003 QE84" bgcolor=#d6d6d6
| – ||  || MBA-O || 18.5 || 1.1 km || single || 7 days || 31 Aug 2003 || 7 || align=left | Disc.: Cerro Tololo || 
|- id="2003 QH84" bgcolor=#fefefe
| 0 ||  || MBA-I || 19.21 || data-sort-value="0.36" | 440 m || multiple || 2003-2022 || 17 Dec 2022 || 42 || align=left | Disc.: Cerro Tololo || 
|- id="2003 QJ84" bgcolor=#d6d6d6
| – ||  || MBA-O || 18.1 || 1.3 km || single || 7 days || 31 Aug 2003 || 7 || align=left | Disc.: Cerro Tololo || 
|- id="2003 QL84" bgcolor=#E9E9E9
| – ||  || MBA-M || 19.3 || data-sort-value="0.77" | 770 m || single || 7 days || 31 Aug 2003 || 7 || align=left | Disc.: Cerro Tololo || 
|- id="2003 QT84" bgcolor=#d6d6d6
| – ||  || MBA-O || 17.3 || 1.9 km || single || 7 days || 31 Aug 2003 || 7 || align=left | Disc.: Cerro Tololo || 
|- id="2003 QV84" bgcolor=#E9E9E9
| – ||  || MBA-M || 19.2 || data-sort-value="0.80" | 800 m || single || 6 days || 30 Aug 2003 || 7 || align=left | Disc.: Cerro Tololo || 
|- id="2003 QH86" bgcolor=#fefefe
| 0 ||  || MBA-I || 18.7 || data-sort-value="0.54" | 540 m || multiple || 2003–2019 || 04 Apr 2019 || 50 || align=left | Disc.: Cerro Tololo || 
|- id="2003 QP89" bgcolor=#E9E9E9
| 1 ||  || MBA-M || 17.6 || data-sort-value="0.90" | 900 m || multiple || 2003–2020 || 21 Nov 2020 || 40 || align=left | Disc.: Črni Vrh Obs. || 
|- id="2003 QJ90" bgcolor=#d6d6d6
| 0 ||  || MBA-O || 15.84 || 3.8 km || multiple || 2003–2021 || 12 May 2021 || 343 || align=left | Disc.: NEAT || 
|- id="2003 QL90" bgcolor=#fefefe
| 0 ||  || MBA-I || 18.28 || data-sort-value="0.66" | 660 m || multiple || 2003–2021 || 03 Aug 2021 || 82 || align=left | Disc.: Cerro TololoAlt.: 2007 VC35 || 
|- id="2003 QT90" bgcolor=#C2E0FF
| 3 ||  || TNO || 6.8 || 145 km || multiple || 2003–2016 || 05 Nov 2016 || 12 || align=left | Disc.: Cerro TololoLoUTNOs, cubewano (cold) || 
|- id="2003 QU90" bgcolor=#C2E0FF
| E ||  || TNO || 7.2 || 121 km || single || 62 days || 24 Oct 2003 || 7 || align=left | Disc.: Cerro TololoLoUTNOs, cubewano (cold) || 
|- id="2003 QV90" bgcolor=#C2E0FF
| 4 ||  || TNO || 7.10 || 126 km || multiple || 2003–2018 || 18 Oct 2018 || 32 || align=left | Disc.: Cerro TololoLoUTNOs, cubewano (cold) || 
|- id="2003 QX90" bgcolor=#C2E0FF
| 3 ||  || TNO || 6.8 || 145 km || multiple || 2003–2020 || 12 Aug 2020 || 17 || align=left | Disc.: Cerro TololoLoUTNOs, cubewano (cold) || 
|- id="2003 QY90" bgcolor=#C2E0FF
| 3 ||  || TNO || 6.47 || 81 km || multiple || 2000–2021 || 03 Oct 2021 || 45 || align=left | Disc.: Cerro TololoLoUTNOs, cubewano (cold), albedo: 0.310; binary: 80 km || 
|- id="2003 QZ90" bgcolor=#C2E0FF
| E ||  || TNO || 6.7 || 157 km || single || 1 day || 25 Aug 2003 || 3 || align=left | Disc.: Cerro TololoLoUTNOs, cubewano? || 
|- id="2003 QB91" bgcolor=#C2E0FF
| 3 ||  || TNO || 6.73 || 213 km || multiple || 2003–2018 || 14 Sep 2018 || 72 || align=left | Disc.: Cerro TololoLoUTNOs, plutino || 
|- id="2003 QC91" bgcolor=#C2E0FF
| E ||  || TNO || 7.0 || 137 km || single || 59 days || 23 Oct 2003 || 5 || align=left | Disc.: Cerro TololoLoUTNOs, cubewano? || 
|- id="2003 QD91" bgcolor=#C2E0FF
| 3 ||  || TNO || 7.3 || 115 km || multiple || 2003–2014 || 29 Jul 2014 || 12 || align=left | Disc.: Cerro TololoLoUTNOs, cubewano (cold) || 
|- id="2003 QE91" bgcolor=#C2E0FF
| 3 ||  || TNO || 7.33 || 114 km || multiple || 2003–2021 || 08 Aug 2021 || 19 || align=left | Disc.: Cerro TololoLoUTNOs, cubewano (cold) || 
|- id="2003 QF91" bgcolor=#C2E0FF
| 3 ||  || TNO || 7.39 || 111 km || multiple || 2003–2021 || 03 Oct 2021 || 18 || align=left | Disc.: Cerro TololoLoUTNOs, cubewano (cold) || 
|- id="2003 QG91" bgcolor=#C2E0FF
| 4 ||  || TNO || 7.37 || 112 km || multiple || 2003–2021 || 12 Sep 2021 || 17 || align=left | Disc.: Cerro TololoLoUTNOs, cubewano (cold) || 
|- id="2003 QJ91" bgcolor=#C2E0FF
| 4 ||  || TNO || 6.81 || 144 km || multiple || 2003–2021 || 12 Sep 2021 || 20 || align=left | Disc.: Cerro TololoLoUTNOs, cubewano (cold) || 
|- id="2003 QK91" bgcolor=#C2E0FF
| 1 ||  || TNO || 7.3 || 131 km || multiple || 2003–2019 || 04 Sep 2019 || 54 || align=left | Disc.: Cerro TololoLoUTNOs, SDO, BR-mag: 1.37; taxonomy: BR || 
|- id="2003 QL91" bgcolor=#C2E0FF
| 3 ||  || TNO || 7.01 || 132 km || multiple || 2003–2021 || 04 Oct 2021 || 59 || align=left | Disc.: Cerro TololoLoUTNOs, cubewano (cold) || 
|- id="2003 QM91" bgcolor=#C2E0FF
| 3 ||  || TNO || 6.50 || 167 km || multiple || 2003–2020 || 15 Oct 2020 || 58 || align=left | Disc.: Cerro TololoLoUTNOs, cubewano (cold) || 
|- id="2003 QN91" bgcolor=#C2E0FF
| 3 ||  || TNO || 7.3 || 115 km || multiple || 2003–2014 || 29 Jul 2014 || 15 || align=left | Disc.: Cerro TololoLoUTNOs, cubewano (cold) || 
|- id="2003 QO91" bgcolor=#C2E0FF
| 3 ||  || TNO || 7.12 || 193 km || multiple || 2003–2021 || 05 Nov 2021 || 30 || align=left | Disc.: Cerro TololoLoUTNOs, cubewano (hot) || 
|- id="2003 QP91" bgcolor=#C2E0FF
| 2 ||  || TNO || 7.4 || 120 km || multiple || 2003–2018 || 18 Oct 2018 || 27 || align=left | Disc.: Cerro TololoLoUTNOs, res3:4Alt.: 2013 RW155 || 
|- id="2003 QQ91" bgcolor=#C2E0FF
| 3 ||  || TNO || 7.78 || 143 km || multiple || 2003–2017 || 18 Sep 2017 || 42 || align=left | Disc.: Cerro TololoLoUTNOs, cubewano (hot), BR-mag: 1.18 || 
|- id="2003 QR91" bgcolor=#C2E0FF
| 1 ||  || TNO || 6.6 || 207 km || multiple || 2003–2020 || 19 Aug 2020 || 106 || align=left | Disc.: Cerro TololoLoUTNOs, other TNO, albedo: 0.054; binary: 189 km || 
|- id="2003 QS91" bgcolor=#C2E0FF
| 3 ||  || TNO || 7.7 || 96 km || multiple || 2003–2014 || 29 Jul 2014 || 13 || align=left | Disc.: Cerro TololoLoUTNOs, cubewano (cold) || 
|- id="2003 QT91" bgcolor=#C2E0FF
| 3 ||  || TNO || 7.20 || 121 km || multiple || 2003–2021 || 12 Sep 2021 || 46 || align=left | Disc.: Cerro TololoLoUTNOs, cubewano (cold) || 
|- id="2003 QU91" bgcolor=#C2E0FF
| – ||  || TNO || 7.4 || 138 km || single || 58 days || 22 Oct 2003 || 7 || align=left | Disc.: Cerro TololoLoUTNOs, other TNO || 
|- id="2003 QV91" bgcolor=#C2E0FF
| E ||  || TNO || 7.5 || 150 km || single || 61 days || 23 Oct 2003 || 7 || align=left | Disc.: Cerro TololoLoUTNOs, plutino? || 
|- id="2003 QW91" bgcolor=#C2E0FF
| E ||  || TNO || 9.1 || 72 km || single || 1 day || 24 Aug 2003 || 3 || align=left | Disc.: Cerro TololoLoUTNOs, plutino? || 
|- id="2003 QX91" bgcolor=#C2E0FF
| 2 ||  || TNO || 8.46 || 74 km || multiple || 2003–2021 || 03 Oct 2021 || 16 || align=left | Disc.: Cerro TololoLoUTNOs, res4:7 || 
|- id="2003 QY91" bgcolor=#C2E0FF
| E ||  || TNO || 7.7 || 109 km || single || 1 day || 24 Aug 2003 || 3 || align=left | Disc.: Cerro TololoLoUTNOs, SDO || 
|- id="2003 QA92" bgcolor=#C2E0FF
| 3 ||  || TNO || 6.77 || 184 km || multiple || 2003–2021 || 28 Sep 2021 || 153 || align=left | Disc.: Cerro TololoLoUTNOs, other TNO, BR-mag: 1.67 || 
|- id="2003 QJ92" bgcolor=#fefefe
| 0 ||  || MBA-I || 17.96 || data-sort-value="0.76" | 760 m || multiple || 2003–2021 || 31 Oct 2021 || 128 || align=left | Disc.: Table Mountain Obs. || 
|- id="2003 QL92" bgcolor=#E9E9E9
| 1 ||  || MBA-M || 17.17 || 2.5 km || multiple || 2002–2021 || 10 Nov 2021 || 61 || align=left | Disc.: LINEARAlt.: 2002 ES143 || 
|- id="2003 QR92" bgcolor=#E9E9E9
| 0 ||  || MBA-M || 16.7 || 1.9 km || multiple || 2003–2018 || 18 Mar 2018 || 107 || align=left | Disc.: NEATAlt.: 2012 TT315 || 
|- id="2003 QV92" bgcolor=#E9E9E9
| 0 ||  || MBA-M || 17.2 || 1.1 km || multiple || 1995–2021 || 18 Jan 2021 || 142 || align=left | Disc.: NEATAlt.: 2011 OE37 || 
|- id="2003 QU93" bgcolor=#fefefe
| 0 ||  || MBA-I || 17.17 || 1.1 km || multiple || 2003–2022 || 25 Jan 2022 || 166 || align=left | Disc.: AMOS || 
|- id="2003 QS94" bgcolor=#E9E9E9
| 0 ||  || MBA-M || 16.65 || 2.6 km || multiple || 2003–2021 || 28 Oct 2021 || 293 || align=left | Disc.: AMOSAlt.: 2007 RJ12, 2011 EQ61 || 
|- id="2003 QO95" bgcolor=#E9E9E9
| 2 ||  || MBA-M || 18.1 || data-sort-value="0.71" | 710 m || multiple || 2003–2020 || 10 Dec 2020 || 27 || align=left | Disc.: LPL/Spacewatch IIAdded on 17 January 2021 || 
|- id="2003 QG96" bgcolor=#FA8072
| 4 ||  || MCA || 19.0 || data-sort-value="0.67" | 670 m || single || 60 days || 29 Oct 2003 || 50 || align=left | Disc.: Spacewatch || 
|- id="2003 QH96" bgcolor=#FA8072
| 5 ||  || MCA || 19.9 || data-sort-value="0.58" | 580 m || single || 55 days || 22 Oct 2003 || 26 || align=left | Disc.: NEAT || 
|- id="2003 QL96" bgcolor=#FFC2E0
| 4 ||  || AMO || 21.4 || data-sort-value="0.19" | 190 m || single || 60 days || 30 Oct 2003 || 159 || align=left | Disc.: LINEAR || 
|- id="2003 QN96" bgcolor=#fefefe
| 0 ||  || MBA-I || 18.3 || data-sort-value="0.65" | 650 m || multiple || 2003–2020 || 26 Jan 2020 || 45 || align=left | Disc.: NEATAlt.: 2007 TC174 || 
|- id="2003 QO96" bgcolor=#E9E9E9
| 0 ||  || MBA-M || 17.1 || 1.6 km || multiple || 1998–2020 || 20 Oct 2020 || 128 || align=left | Disc.: NEATAlt.: 2016 UT63 || 
|- id="2003 QW96" bgcolor=#d6d6d6
| 0 ||  || MBA-O || 17.5 || 1.8 km || multiple || 2003–2020 || 20 Sep 2020 || 30 || align=left | Disc.: LPL/Spacewatch II || 
|- id="2003 QQ97" bgcolor=#d6d6d6
| 0 ||  || MBA-O || 17.1 || 2.1 km || multiple || 2002–2020 || 18 Nov 2020 || 143 || align=left | Disc.: LPL/Spacewatch II || 
|- id="2003 QT97" bgcolor=#E9E9E9
| 2 ||  || MBA-M || 18.8 || data-sort-value="0.52" | 520 m || multiple || 2003–2019 || 22 Aug 2019 || 48 || align=left | Disc.: LPL/Spacewatch IIAlt.: 2015 PZ155 || 
|- id="2003 QC98" bgcolor=#d6d6d6
| 3 ||  || MBA-O || 17.9 || 1.5 km || multiple || 2003–2019 || 27 Oct 2019 || 35 || align=left | Disc.: LPL/Spacewatch IIAdded on 22 July 2020Alt.: 2014 WW92 || 
|- id="2003 QE98" bgcolor=#fefefe
| 1 ||  || MBA-I || 18.8 || data-sort-value="0.52" | 520 m || multiple || 2003–2020 || 05 Nov 2020 || 58 || align=left | Disc.: LPL/Spacewatch IIAdded on 19 October 2020 || 
|- id="2003 QF98" bgcolor=#d6d6d6
| 0 ||  || MBA-O || 16.7 || 2.5 km || multiple || 2003–2020 || 17 Oct 2020 || 52 || align=left | Disc.: LPL/Spacewatch IIAdded on 17 June 2021Alt.: 2014 QD414, 2015 TN103 || 
|- id="2003 QO98" bgcolor=#fefefe
| 0 ||  || MBA-I || 18.4 || data-sort-value="0.62" | 620 m || multiple || 2003–2020 || 17 Nov 2020 || 60 || align=left | Disc.: LPL/Spacewatch II || 
|- id="2003 QS98" bgcolor=#d6d6d6
| 0 ||  || MBA-O || 16.97 || 2.2 km || multiple || 2003–2021 || 07 Feb 2021 || 68 || align=left | Disc.: LPL/Spacewatch IIAdded on 17 June 2021 || 
|- id="2003 QT98" bgcolor=#E9E9E9
| 0 ||  || MBA-M || 17.86 || 1.5 km || multiple || 2003–2021 || 08 Sep 2021 || 71 || align=left | Disc.: LPL/Spacewatch IIAlt.: 2005 XF110 || 
|- id="2003 QU98" bgcolor=#d6d6d6
| 0 ||  || HIL || 16.5 || 2.8 km || multiple || 2003–2021 || 15 Jan 2021 || 84 || align=left | Disc.: LPL/Spacewatch II || 
|- id="2003 QK100" bgcolor=#E9E9E9
| 0 ||  || MBA-M || 17.65 || 1.2 km || multiple || 2003–2021 || 11 Nov 2021 || 40 || align=left | Disc.: NEAT || 
|- id="2003 QX102" bgcolor=#FA8072
| 0 ||  || MCA || 18.2 || data-sort-value="0.68" | 680 m || multiple || 2003–2020 || 10 Dec 2020 || 79 || align=left | Disc.: LINEARAlt.: 2016 KB || 
|- id="2003 QL104" bgcolor=#fefefe
| 0 ||  || MBA-I || 17.15 || 1.1 km || multiple || 2003–2021 || 04 Aug 2021 || 193 || align=left | Disc.: Reedy Creek Obs. || 
|- id="2003 QM104" bgcolor=#E9E9E9
| 2 ||  || MBA-M || 17.3 || 1.0 km || multiple || 2003–2018 || 11 Apr 2018 || 53 || align=left | Disc.: NEAT || 
|- id="2003 QV105" bgcolor=#E9E9E9
| 1 ||  || MBA-M || 17.27 || 2.0 km || multiple || 2003–2021 || 26 Aug 2021 || 46 || align=left | Disc.: LINEARAdded on 17 June 2021Alt.: 2021 JU16 || 
|- id="2003 QG106" bgcolor=#fefefe
| 0 ||  || MBA-I || 17.3 || 1.0 km || multiple || 2003–2020 || 21 Apr 2020 || 146 || align=left | Disc.: AMOS || 
|- id="2003 QX107" bgcolor=#fefefe
| 0 ||  || HUN || 18.83 || data-sort-value="0.51" | 510 m || multiple || 2003–2021 || 16 Apr 2021 || 62 || align=left | Disc.: SpacewatchAdded on 9 March 2021 || 
|- id="2003 QA108" bgcolor=#FA8072
| 0 ||  || MCA || 16.7 || 1.9 km || multiple || 1994–2021 || 11 Jan 2021 || 456 || align=left | Disc.: AMOS || 
|- id="2003 QG110" bgcolor=#d6d6d6
| 0 ||  || MBA-O || 17.2 || 2.0 km || multiple || 2003–2021 || 18 Jan 2021 || 69 || align=left | Disc.: LPL/Spacewatch IIAlt.: 2009 WK232 || 
|- id="2003 QM110" bgcolor=#fefefe
| 0 ||  || MBA-I || 18.6 || data-sort-value="0.57" | 570 m || multiple || 1999–2019 || 24 Aug 2019 || 85 || align=left | Disc.: Spacewatch || 
|- id="2003 QP110" bgcolor=#E9E9E9
| 2 ||  || MBA-M || 18.7 || data-sort-value="0.54" | 540 m || multiple || 2003–2021 || 15 Feb 2021 || 24 || align=left | Disc.: SpacewatchAdded on 11 May 2021Alt.: 2021 CC21 || 
|- id="2003 QX111" bgcolor=#C2E0FF
| 2 ||  || TNO || 6.95 || 434 km || multiple || 2003–2018 || 14 Sep 2018 || 121 || align=left | Disc.: Cerro TololoLoUTNOs, plutino, albedo: 0.018 || 
|- id="2003 QY111" bgcolor=#C2E0FF
| 3 ||  || TNO || 7.13 || 125 km || multiple || 2003–2018 || 18 Oct 2018 || 36 || align=left | Disc.: Cerro TololoLoUTNOs, cubewano (cold) || 
|- id="2003 QZ111" bgcolor=#C2E0FF
| 3 ||  || TNO || 7.18 || 122 km || multiple || 2003–2021 || 12 Sep 2021 || 78 || align=left | Disc.: Cerro TololoLoUTNOs, cubewano (cold) || 
|- id="2003 QB112" bgcolor=#C2E0FF
| 3 ||  || TNO || 7.2 || 186 km || multiple || 2003–2014 || 27 Sep 2014 || 18 || align=left | Disc.: Cerro TololoLoUTNOs, cubewano (hot) || 
|- id="2003 QC112" bgcolor=#C7FF8F
| 2 ||  || CEN || 8.7 || 101 km || multiple || 2003–2017 || 23 Sep 2017 || 33 || align=left | Disc.: Cerro Tololo || 
|- id="2003 QD112" bgcolor=#C7FF8F
| 1 ||  || CEN || 10.7 || 40 km || multiple || 2002–2007 || 11 Nov 2007 || 18 || align=left | Disc.: Cerro Tololo || 
|- id="2003 QE112" bgcolor=#C2E0FF
| 3 ||  || TNO || 6.46 || 170 km || multiple || 2003–2021 || 03 Oct 2021 || 16 || align=left | Disc.: Cerro TololoLoUTNOs, cubewano (cold) || 
|- id="2003 QG112" bgcolor=#fefefe
| 0 ||  || MBA-I || 18.5 || data-sort-value="0.59" | 590 m || multiple || 2000–2020 || 20 Dec 2020 || 107 || align=left | Disc.: CINEOSAdded on 19 October 2020Alt.: 2015 DS87 || 
|- id="2003 QJ112" bgcolor=#FA8072
| 0 ||  || MCA || 17.2 || 1.5 km || multiple || 2003–2021 || 15 Jan 2021 || 195 || align=left | Disc.: AMOS || 
|- id="2003 QM112" bgcolor=#C2E0FF
| – ||  || TNO || 14.1 || 8.0 km || single || 54 days || 22 Oct 2003 || 9 || align=left | Disc.: Mauna Kea Obs.LoUTNOs, centaur || 
|- id="2003 QN112" bgcolor=#C7FF8F
| – ||  || CEN || 12.9 || 15 km || single || 54 days || 22 Oct 2003 || 16 || align=left | Disc.: Mauna Kea Obs. || 
|- id="2003 QO112" bgcolor=#C2E0FF
| E ||  || TNO || 11.9 || 23 km || single || 54 days || 22 Oct 2003 || 9 || align=left | Disc.: Mauna Kea Obs.LoUTNOs, centaur || 
|- id="2003 QP112" bgcolor=#C7FF8F
| – ||  || CEN || 12.7 || 16 km || single || 54 days || 22 Oct 2003 || 14 || align=left | Disc.: Mauna Kea Obs. || 
|- id="2003 QS112" bgcolor=#E9E9E9
| 0 ||  || MBA-M || 17.5 || data-sort-value="0.94" | 940 m || multiple || 2003–2020 || 10 Dec 2020 || 46 || align=left | Disc.: NEAT || 
|- id="2003 QX113" bgcolor=#C2E0FF
| 3 ||  || TNO || 5.04 || 371 km || multiple || 2003–2021 || 12 Sep 2021 || 93 || align=left | Disc.: Mauna Kea Obs.LoUTNOs, SDO || 
|- id="2003 QY113" bgcolor=#C2E0FF
| E ||  || TNO || 6.7 || 157 km || single || 4 days || 04 Sep 2003 || 4 || align=left | Disc.: Mauna Kea Obs.LoUTNOs, cubewano? || 
|- id="2003 QB115" bgcolor=#fefefe
| 0 ||  || MBA-I || 17.8 || data-sort-value="0.82" | 820 m || multiple || 2003–2020 || 19 Jan 2020 || 141 || align=left | Disc.: NEAT || 
|- id="2003 QF115" bgcolor=#E9E9E9
| 0 ||  || MBA-M || 17.5 || 1.3 km || multiple || 1999–2020 || 18 Oct 2020 || 204 || align=left | Disc.: NEATAlt.: 2016 TD20 || 
|- id="2003 QR115" bgcolor=#d6d6d6
| 0 ||  || MBA-O || 17.1 || 2.1 km || multiple || 2003–2020 || 02 Feb 2020 || 60 || align=left | Disc.: Mauna Kea Obs.Added on 22 July 2020 || 
|- id="2003 QS115" bgcolor=#d6d6d6
| 0 ||  || MBA-O || 17.4 || 1.8 km || multiple || 2003–2019 || 08 Aug 2019 || 32 || align=left | Disc.: Mauna Kea Obs. || 
|- id="2003 QY115" bgcolor=#d6d6d6
| 0 ||  || MBA-O || 17.5 || 1.8 km || multiple || 2003–2021 || 17 Jan 2021 || 66 || align=left | Disc.: Mauna Kea Obs.Added on 22 July 2020 || 
|- id="2003 QZ115" bgcolor=#E9E9E9
| 0 ||  || MBA-M || 18.1 || 1.3 km || multiple || 2003–2020 || 13 May 2020 || 44 || align=left | Disc.: Mauna Kea Obs.Added on 22 July 2020Alt.: 2015 ET67 || 
|- id="2003 QB116" bgcolor=#fefefe
| 2 ||  || MBA-I || 19.23 || data-sort-value="0.42" | 420 m || multiple || 2003–2021 || 28 Nov 2021 || 31 || align=left | Disc.: Mauna Kea Obs. || 
|- id="2003 QF116" bgcolor=#fefefe
| 0 ||  || MBA-I || 18.45 || data-sort-value="0.61" | 610 m || multiple || 2003–2022 || 27 Jan 2022 || 101 || align=left | Disc.: Mauna Kea Obs. || 
|- id="2003 QJ116" bgcolor=#E9E9E9
| 0 ||  || MBA-M || 17.5 || 1.8 km || multiple || 2003–2020 || 21 Apr 2020 || 62 || align=left | Disc.: Mauna Kea Obs.Added on 22 July 2020 || 
|- id="2003 QK116" bgcolor=#fefefe
| 1 ||  || MBA-I || 19.49 || data-sort-value="0.38" | 380 m || multiple || 2003–2021 || 08 Sep 2021 || 39 || align=left | Disc.: Mauna Kea Obs.Added on 30 September 2021 || 
|- id="2003 QN116" bgcolor=#d6d6d6
| 3 ||  || MBA-O || 17.1 || 2.1 km || multiple || 2003–2020 || 13 Oct 2020 || 27 || align=left | Disc.: Mauna Kea Obs.Added on 17 January 2021 || 
|- id="2003 QS116" bgcolor=#E9E9E9
| 0 ||  || MBA-M || 18.0 || 1.4 km || multiple || 2003–2019 || 08 Jan 2019 || 37 || align=left | Disc.: Mauna Kea Obs. || 
|- id="2003 QT116" bgcolor=#fefefe
| 4 ||  || MBA-I || 18.9 || data-sort-value="0.49" | 490 m || multiple || 2003–2017 || 29 Sep 2017 || 19 || align=left | Disc.: Mauna Kea Obs. || 
|- id="2003 QV116" bgcolor=#fefefe
| 1 ||  || MBA-I || 19.2 || data-sort-value="0.43" | 430 m || multiple || 2003–2019 || 29 Oct 2019 || 35 || align=left | Disc.: Mauna Kea Obs. || 
|- id="2003 QX116" bgcolor=#E9E9E9
| 3 ||  || MBA-M || 18.5 || data-sort-value="0.84" | 840 m || multiple || 2003–2021 || 09 Dec 2021 || 38 || align=left | Disc.: Mauna Kea Obs.Added on 24 December 2021 || 
|- id="2003 QH117" bgcolor=#fefefe
| 0 ||  || MBA-I || 19.0 || data-sort-value="0.47" | 470 m || multiple || 2003–2021 || 11 Sep 2021 || 35 || align=left | Disc.: Mauna Kea Obs.Added on 30 September 2021Alt.: 2017 KM44 || 
|- id="2003 QU117" bgcolor=#E9E9E9
| 2 ||  || MBA-M || 19.0 || data-sort-value="0.47" | 470 m || multiple || 2003–2020 || 06 Dec 2020 || 27 || align=left | Disc.: Cerro TololoAdded on 19 October 2020 || 
|- id="2003 QZ117" bgcolor=#E9E9E9
| 1 ||  || MBA-M || 18.6 || data-sort-value="0.80" | 800 m || multiple || 2003–2020 || 14 Sep 2020 || 26 || align=left | Disc.: Cerro TololoAdded on 17 January 2021 || 
|- id="2003 QB118" bgcolor=#d6d6d6
| 2 ||  || MBA-O || 17.6 || 1.7 km || multiple || 2003–2019 || 24 Aug 2019 || 24 || align=left | Disc.: Cerro TololoAdded on 17 January 2021 || 
|- id="2003 QN118" bgcolor=#d6d6d6
| 0 ||  || MBA-O || 17.17 || 2.0 km || multiple || 2003–2021 || 28 Oct 2021 || 51 || align=left | Disc.: Cerro TololoAdded on 19 October 2020 || 
|- id="2003 QQ118" bgcolor=#d6d6d6
| 0 ||  || MBA-O || 17.01 || 2.2 km || multiple || 2003–2021 || 15 Apr 2021 || 118 || align=left | Disc.: Cerro TololoAlt.: 2006 DP98, 2013 RY23 || 
|- id="2003 QU118" bgcolor=#d6d6d6
| 0 ||  || MBA-O || 17.66 || 1.6 km || multiple || 2003–2021 || 26 Nov 2021 || 43 || align=left | Disc.: Cerro TololoAlt.: 2006 CG79, 2009 SE207 || 
|- id="2003 QV118" bgcolor=#E9E9E9
| 1 ||  || MBA-M || 18.3 || data-sort-value="0.92" | 920 m || multiple || 2003–2021 || 06 Jan 2021 || 81 || align=left | Disc.: Cerro TololoAdded on 17 January 2021 || 
|- id="2003 QY118" bgcolor=#d6d6d6
| 0 ||  || MBA-O || 17.9 || 1.5 km || multiple || 2003–2021 || 12 Feb 2021 || 26 || align=left | Disc.: Cerro TololoAdded on 11 May 2021Alt.: 2003 QM125 || 
|- id="2003 QZ118" bgcolor=#fefefe
| 0 ||  || MBA-I || 18.4 || data-sort-value="0.62" | 620 m || multiple || 2002–2021 || 19 Mar 2021 || 49 || align=left | Disc.: Cerro TololoAdded on 5 November 2021Alt.: 2010 BA123 || 
|- id="2003 QE120" bgcolor=#d6d6d6
| 3 ||  || MBA-O || 18.0 || 1.4 km || multiple || 2003–2018 || 05 Oct 2018 || 23 || align=left | Disc.: Cerro Tololo || 
|- id="2003 QG120" bgcolor=#d6d6d6
| 0 ||  || MBA-O || 17.25 || 2.0 km || multiple || 2003–2021 || 31 May 2021 || 81 || align=left | Disc.: Mauna Kea Obs. || 
|- id="2003 QJ120" bgcolor=#d6d6d6
| 2 ||  || HIL || 16.6 || 2.7 km || multiple || 2003–2017 || 26 Apr 2017 || 20 || align=left | Disc.: Cerro Tololo || 
|- id="2003 QK120" bgcolor=#fefefe
| 0 ||  || MBA-I || 19.3 || data-sort-value="0.41" | 410 m || multiple || 2003–2019 || 29 Sep 2019 || 61 || align=left | Disc.: NEAT || 
|- id="2003 QL120" bgcolor=#fefefe
| 0 ||  || MBA-I || 17.59 || data-sort-value="0.90" | 900 m || multiple || 2003–2021 || 28 Nov 2021 || 119 || align=left | Disc.: NEAT || 
|- id="2003 QO120" bgcolor=#fefefe
| 0 ||  || MBA-I || 18.03 || data-sort-value="0.74" | 740 m || multiple || 2003–2021 || 03 Apr 2021 || 131 || align=left | Disc.: NEAT || 
|- id="2003 QQ120" bgcolor=#fefefe
| 1 ||  || MBA-I || 18.1 || data-sort-value="0.71" | 710 m || multiple || 2003–2018 || 29 Nov 2018 || 34 || align=left | Disc.: NEAT || 
|- id="2003 QU120" bgcolor=#E9E9E9
| 0 ||  || MBA-M || 17.1 || 1.1 km || multiple || 2003–2021 || 08 Jan 2021 || 141 || align=left | Disc.: NEAT || 
|- id="2003 QX120" bgcolor=#E9E9E9
| 0 ||  || MBA-M || 16.8 || 2.4 km || multiple || 2003–2020 || 16 May 2020 || 84 || align=left | Disc.: NEAT || 
|- id="2003 QY120" bgcolor=#E9E9E9
| 0 ||  || MBA-M || 17.33 || 1.9 km || multiple || 2003–2021 || 27 Nov 2021 || 130 || align=left | Disc.: Cerro Tololo || 
|- id="2003 QC121" bgcolor=#fefefe
| 0 ||  || MBA-I || 18.3 || data-sort-value="0.65" | 650 m || multiple || 2003–2020 || 09 Dec 2020 || 70 || align=left | Disc.: NEAT || 
|- id="2003 QE121" bgcolor=#fefefe
| 0 ||  || MBA-I || 18.4 || data-sort-value="0.62" | 620 m || multiple || 2003–2021 || 17 Jan 2021 || 49 || align=left | Disc.: AMOS || 
|- id="2003 QG121" bgcolor=#E9E9E9
| 0 ||  || MBA-M || 18.02 || 1.0 km || multiple || 1999–2022 || 27 Jan 2022 || 75 || align=left | Disc.: SpacewatchAlt.: 1999 TN74 || 
|- id="2003 QJ121" bgcolor=#fefefe
| 0 ||  || MBA-I || 18.5 || data-sort-value="0.59" | 590 m || multiple || 2003–2020 || 17 Jun 2020 || 57 || align=left | Disc.: Cerro Tololo || 
|- id="2003 QK121" bgcolor=#E9E9E9
| 1 ||  || MBA-M || 18.1 || 1.0 km || multiple || 2003–2020 || 15 Oct 2020 || 67 || align=left | Disc.: Cerro Tololo || 
|- id="2003 QL121" bgcolor=#fefefe
| 0 ||  || MBA-I || 18.1 || data-sort-value="0.71" | 710 m || multiple || 2003–2020 || 06 Dec 2020 || 93 || align=left | Disc.: CINEOS || 
|- id="2003 QN121" bgcolor=#d6d6d6
| 0 ||  || MBA-O || 16.9 || 2.3 km || multiple || 2001–2018 || 12 Apr 2018 || 36 || align=left | Disc.: Cerro Tololo || 
|- id="2003 QO121" bgcolor=#fefefe
| 1 ||  || MBA-I || 18.2 || data-sort-value="0.68" | 680 m || multiple || 2003–2015 || 08 Nov 2015 || 37 || align=left | Disc.: Cerro Tololo || 
|- id="2003 QP121" bgcolor=#d6d6d6
| 0 ||  || MBA-O || 16.71 || 2.5 km || multiple || 2003–2021 || 26 Nov 2021 || 45 || align=left | Disc.: Cerro Tololo || 
|- id="2003 QQ121" bgcolor=#E9E9E9
| 0 ||  || MBA-M || 17.9 || data-sort-value="0.78" | 780 m || multiple || 2003–2020 || 08 Oct 2020 || 61 || align=left | Disc.: Cerro Tololo || 
|- id="2003 QU121" bgcolor=#E9E9E9
| 0 ||  || MBA-M || 18.22 || data-sort-value="0.95" | 950 m || multiple || 2003–2022 || 04 Jan 2022 || 57 || align=left | Disc.: Cerro Tololo || 
|- id="2003 QV121" bgcolor=#fefefe
| 0 ||  || MBA-I || 18.7 || data-sort-value="0.54" | 540 m || multiple || 2003–2019 || 27 Sep 2019 || 58 || align=left | Disc.: NEAT || 
|- id="2003 QW121" bgcolor=#E9E9E9
| 0 ||  || MBA-M || 17.92 || 1.5 km || multiple || 2003–2021 || 02 Oct 2021 || 48 || align=left | Disc.: Cerro Tololo || 
|- id="2003 QX121" bgcolor=#E9E9E9
| 0 ||  || MBA-M || 17.68 || 1.6 km || multiple || 2003–2021 || 17 Jun 2021 || 40 || align=left | Disc.: Cerro Tololo || 
|- id="2003 QY121" bgcolor=#fefefe
| 1 ||  || MBA-I || 19.4 || data-sort-value="0.39" | 390 m || multiple || 2003–2018 || 20 Jan 2018 || 33 || align=left | Disc.: Mauna Kea Obs. || 
|- id="2003 QZ121" bgcolor=#d6d6d6
| 0 ||  || MBA-O || 17.6 || 1.7 km || multiple || 2003–2017 || 27 May 2017 || 30 || align=left | Disc.: Cerro Tololo || 
|- id="2003 QA122" bgcolor=#fefefe
| 0 ||  || MBA-I || 18.3 || data-sort-value="0.65" | 650 m || multiple || 2003–2020 || 14 Feb 2020 || 56 || align=left | Disc.: Cerro Tololo || 
|- id="2003 QB122" bgcolor=#fefefe
| 0 ||  || MBA-I || 18.65 || data-sort-value="0.55" | 550 m || multiple || 2003–2021 || 11 May 2021 || 61 || align=left | Disc.: Mauna Kea Obs. || 
|- id="2003 QC122" bgcolor=#fefefe
| 0 ||  || MBA-I || 18.94 || data-sort-value="0.48" | 480 m || multiple || 2003–2021 || 30 Nov 2021 || 37 || align=left | Disc.: Cerro Tololo || 
|- id="2003 QD122" bgcolor=#E9E9E9
| 0 ||  || MBA-M || 18.50 || 1.1 km || multiple || 2003–2021 || 08 Sep 2021 || 36 || align=left | Disc.: Mauna Kea Obs. || 
|- id="2003 QE122" bgcolor=#E9E9E9
| 0 ||  || MBA-M || 17.7 || 1.2 km || multiple || 2003–2021 || 06 Jan 2021 || 160 || align=left | Disc.: NEAT || 
|- id="2003 QF122" bgcolor=#FA8072
| 1 ||  || MCA || 19.1 || data-sort-value="0.45" | 450 m || multiple || 2003–2019 || 04 Jul 2019 || 34 || align=left | Disc.: Berg. Gladbach || 
|- id="2003 QG122" bgcolor=#d6d6d6
| 1 ||  || MBA-O || 17.0 || 2.2 km || multiple || 2003–2020 || 17 Dec 2020 || 44 || align=left | Disc.: NEAT || 
|- id="2003 QH122" bgcolor=#E9E9E9
| 3 ||  || MBA-M || 17.3 || 1.0 km || multiple || 2003–2020 || 23 Nov 2020 || 55 || align=left | Disc.: Cerro Tololo || 
|- id="2003 QK122" bgcolor=#fefefe
| 0 ||  || MBA-I || 18.49 || data-sort-value="0.60" | 600 m || multiple || 2003–2021 || 15 Apr 2021 || 90 || align=left | Disc.: AMOS || 
|- id="2003 QM122" bgcolor=#E9E9E9
| 0 ||  || MBA-M || 17.2 || 2.0 km || multiple || 2003–2020 || 22 Apr 2020 || 70 || align=left | Disc.: Mauna Kea Obs. || 
|- id="2003 QN122" bgcolor=#fefefe
| 0 ||  || MBA-I || 18.4 || data-sort-value="0.62" | 620 m || multiple || 2003–2020 || 20 Oct 2020 || 61 || align=left | Disc.: NEAT || 
|- id="2003 QO122" bgcolor=#E9E9E9
| 0 ||  || MBA-M || 17.8 || data-sort-value="0.82" | 820 m || multiple || 2003–2021 || 18 Jan 2021 || 69 || align=left | Disc.: Cerro Tololo || 
|- id="2003 QP122" bgcolor=#E9E9E9
| 0 ||  || MBA-M || 17.5 || data-sort-value="0.94" | 940 m || multiple || 2003–2020 || 06 Dec 2020 || 98 || align=left | Disc.: Cerro Tololo || 
|- id="2003 QQ122" bgcolor=#E9E9E9
| 0 ||  || MBA-M || 17.1 || 1.6 km || multiple || 2003–2020 || 17 Dec 2020 || 114 || align=left | Disc.: NEAT || 
|- id="2003 QR122" bgcolor=#d6d6d6
| 0 ||  || MBA-O || 16.7 || 2.5 km || multiple || 2003–2020 || 07 Dec 2020 || 59 || align=left | Disc.: NEAT || 
|- id="2003 QU122" bgcolor=#fefefe
| 0 ||  || MBA-I || 18.47 || data-sort-value="0.60" | 600 m || multiple || 2003–2021 || 09 Nov 2021 || 124 || align=left | Disc.: Cerro Tololo || 
|- id="2003 QV122" bgcolor=#E9E9E9
| 0 ||  || MBA-M || 17.67 || 1.6 km || multiple || 2003–2021 || 10 Aug 2021 || 73 || align=left | Disc.: Cerro Tololo || 
|- id="2003 QW122" bgcolor=#fefefe
| 0 ||  || MBA-I || 17.87 || data-sort-value="0.79" | 790 m || multiple || 2003–2021 || 09 Jul 2021 || 92 || align=left | Disc.: NEAT || 
|- id="2003 QX122" bgcolor=#fefefe
| 0 ||  || MBA-I || 18.3 || data-sort-value="0.65" | 650 m || multiple || 2003–2020 || 10 Dec 2020 || 62 || align=left | Disc.: NEAT || 
|- id="2003 QA123" bgcolor=#fefefe
| 0 ||  || MBA-I || 18.19 || data-sort-value="0.68" | 680 m || multiple || 2003–2021 || 16 Apr 2021 || 50 || align=left | Disc.: CINEOS || 
|- id="2003 QE123" bgcolor=#fefefe
| 2 ||  || MBA-I || 18.8 || data-sort-value="0.52" | 520 m || multiple || 2003–2018 || 02 Oct 2018 || 39 || align=left | Disc.: NEAT || 
|- id="2003 QF123" bgcolor=#fefefe
| 0 ||  || MBA-I || 18.29 || data-sort-value="0.65" | 650 m || multiple || 2003–2021 || 11 May 2021 || 65 || align=left | Disc.: NEAT || 
|- id="2003 QG123" bgcolor=#fefefe
| 1 ||  || HUN || 18.8 || data-sort-value="0.52" | 520 m || multiple || 1998–2019 || 21 Dec 2019 || 41 || align=left | Disc.: Cerro Tololo || 
|- id="2003 QH123" bgcolor=#E9E9E9
| 0 ||  || MBA-M || 18.10 || data-sort-value="0.71" | 710 m || multiple || 2003–2022 || 25 Jan 2022 || 44 || align=left | Disc.: Mauna Kea Obs. || 
|- id="2003 QJ123" bgcolor=#E9E9E9
| 0 ||  || MBA-M || 18.2 || data-sort-value="0.68" | 680 m || multiple || 2003–2020 || 24 Oct 2020 || 43 || align=left | Disc.: Cerro Tololo || 
|- id="2003 QK123" bgcolor=#E9E9E9
| 2 ||  || MBA-M || 18.4 || data-sort-value="0.62" | 620 m || multiple || 2003–2019 || 04 Jul 2019 || 30 || align=left | Disc.: NEAT || 
|- id="2003 QL123" bgcolor=#E9E9E9
| 0 ||  || MBA-M || 17.9 || 1.5 km || multiple || 2003–2019 || 08 Feb 2019 || 40 || align=left | Disc.: Cerro TololoAlt.: 2015 GV3 || 
|- id="2003 QM123" bgcolor=#fefefe
| 1 ||  || MBA-I || 18.6 || data-sort-value="0.57" | 570 m || multiple || 2003–2020 || 14 Dec 2020 || 46 || align=left | Disc.: NEAT || 
|- id="2003 QP123" bgcolor=#d6d6d6
| 0 ||  || MBA-O || 17.2 || 2.0 km || multiple || 2003–2020 || 12 Dec 2020 || 74 || align=left | Disc.: Cerro Tololo || 
|- id="2003 QQ123" bgcolor=#d6d6d6
| 0 ||  || MBA-O || 17.1 || 2.1 km || multiple || 2003–2019 || 23 Sep 2019 || 45 || align=left | Disc.: CINEOS || 
|- id="2003 QS123" bgcolor=#E9E9E9
| 0 ||  || MBA-M || 17.41 || 1.8 km || multiple || 2003–2019 || 04 Feb 2019 || 49 || align=left | Disc.: NEAT || 
|- id="2003 QW123" bgcolor=#fefefe
| 0 ||  || MBA-I || 18.16 || data-sort-value="0.69" | 690 m || multiple || 2003–2021 || 08 Apr 2021 || 63 || align=left | Disc.: Cerro Tololo || 
|- id="2003 QX123" bgcolor=#E9E9E9
| 0 ||  || MBA-M || 18.13 || 1.3 km || multiple || 2003–2021 || 03 Oct 2021 || 86 || align=left | Disc.: Cerro Tololo || 
|- id="2003 QY123" bgcolor=#d6d6d6
| 0 ||  || MBA-O || 17.02 || 2.2 km || multiple || 2003–2021 || 01 Dec 2021 || 47 || align=left | Disc.: Cerro Tololo || 
|- id="2003 QZ123" bgcolor=#d6d6d6
| 0 ||  || HIL || 15.8 || 3.9 km || multiple || 1995–2021 || 04 Jan 2021 || 81 || align=left | Disc.: NEAT || 
|- id="2003 QA124" bgcolor=#fefefe
| 0 ||  || MBA-I || 18.7 || data-sort-value="0.54" | 540 m || multiple || 2003–2021 || 17 Jan 2021 || 40 || align=left | Disc.: Mauna Kea Obs. || 
|- id="2003 QB124" bgcolor=#d6d6d6
| 0 ||  || MBA-O || 16.9 || 2.3 km || multiple || 2003–2019 || 06 Oct 2019 || 29 || align=left | Disc.: Cerro Tololo || 
|- id="2003 QC124" bgcolor=#fefefe
| 0 ||  || MBA-I || 18.7 || data-sort-value="0.54" | 540 m || multiple || 2003–2020 || 21 Jun 2020 || 51 || align=left | Disc.: Mauna Kea Obs. || 
|- id="2003 QD124" bgcolor=#d6d6d6
| 0 ||  || MBA-O || 16.66 || 2.6 km || multiple || 1998–2021 || 03 Dec 2021 || 108 || align=left | Disc.: SpacewatchAdded on 22 July 2020 || 
|- id="2003 QE124" bgcolor=#fefefe
| 0 ||  || MBA-I || 18.4 || data-sort-value="0.62" | 620 m || multiple || 2003–2020 || 29 Feb 2020 || 47 || align=left | Disc.: MLSAdded on 22 July 2020 || 
|- id="2003 QF124" bgcolor=#d6d6d6
| 0 ||  || MBA-O || 17.3 || 1.9 km || multiple || 2003–2020 || 20 Oct 2020 || 39 || align=left | Disc.: MLSAdded on 22 July 2020 || 
|- id="2003 QG124" bgcolor=#d6d6d6
| 0 ||  || MBA-O || 17.7 || 1.6 km || multiple || 2003–2019 || 20 Oct 2019 || 36 || align=left | Disc.: Pan-STARRSAdded on 22 July 2020 || 
|- id="2003 QH124" bgcolor=#E9E9E9
| 0 ||  || MBA-M || 17.93 || 1.4 km || multiple || 2003–2021 || 28 Sep 2021 || 49 || align=left | Disc.: Cerro TololoAdded on 22 July 2020 || 
|- id="2003 QJ124" bgcolor=#E9E9E9
| 0 ||  || MBA-M || 17.96 || 1.4 km || multiple || 2003–2021 || 10 Sep 2021 || 44 || align=left | Disc.: Pan-STARRSAdded on 22 July 2020 || 
|- id="2003 QK124" bgcolor=#d6d6d6
| 0 ||  || MBA-O || 17.1 || 2.1 km || multiple || 2003–2020 || 15 Sep 2020 || 40 || align=left | Disc.: Cerro TololoAdded on 22 July 2020 || 
|- id="2003 QN124" bgcolor=#d6d6d6
| 0 ||  || MBA-O || 17.6 || 1.7 km || multiple || 2003–2019 || 02 Nov 2019 || 46 || align=left | Disc.: Cerro TololoAdded on 22 July 2020 || 
|- id="2003 QO124" bgcolor=#d6d6d6
| 0 ||  || MBA-O || 17.39 || 1.9 km || multiple || 2003–2019 || 27 Sep 2019 || 130 || align=left | Disc.: Pan-STARRSAdded on 22 July 2020Alt.: 2014 TS108 || 
|- id="2003 QP124" bgcolor=#d6d6d6
| 3 ||  || MBA-O || 17.3 || 1.9 km || multiple || 2003–2018 || 15 Oct 2018 || 31 || align=left | Disc.: Cerro TololoAdded on 22 July 2020 || 
|- id="2003 QQ124" bgcolor=#E9E9E9
| 0 ||  || MBA-M || 17.9 || 1.5 km || multiple || 2003–2020 || 13 May 2020 || 31 || align=left | Disc.: Pan-STARRSAdded on 22 July 2020 || 
|- id="2003 QR124" bgcolor=#E9E9E9
| 0 ||  || MBA-M || 18.3 || data-sort-value="0.92" | 920 m || multiple || 2002–2020 || 20 Jul 2020 || 37 || align=left | Disc.: Cerro TololoAdded on 22 July 2020 || 
|- id="2003 QS124" bgcolor=#fefefe
| 1 ||  || MBA-I || 18.9 || data-sort-value="0.49" | 490 m || multiple || 2002–2020 || 22 Aug 2020 || 35 || align=left | Disc.: Cerro TololoAdded on 19 October 2020 || 
|- id="2003 QT124" bgcolor=#E9E9E9
| 0 ||  || MBA-M || 18.0 || 1.1 km || multiple || 2003–2020 || 07 Sep 2020 || 59 || align=left | Disc.: Cerro TololoAdded on 19 October 2020Alt.: 2011 KT17 || 
|- id="2003 QU124" bgcolor=#E9E9E9
| 0 ||  || MBA-M || 18.6 || data-sort-value="0.80" | 800 m || multiple || 2003–2020 || 17 Sep 2020 || 57 || align=left | Disc.: Cerro TololoAdded on 19 October 2020 || 
|- id="2003 QV124" bgcolor=#E9E9E9
| 0 ||  || MBA-M || 17.8 || 1.5 km || multiple || 2003–2020 || 28 Feb 2020 || 40 || align=left | Disc.: MLSAdded on 19 October 2020 || 
|- id="2003 QW124" bgcolor=#fefefe
| 0 ||  || MBA-I || 18.31 || data-sort-value="0.65" | 650 m || multiple || 2003–2021 || 09 Apr 2021 || 59 || align=left | Disc.: SpacewatchAdded on 19 October 2020 || 
|- id="2003 QX124" bgcolor=#FA8072
| 4 ||  || MCA || 19.5 || data-sort-value="0.37" | 370 m || multiple || 2003–2016 || 22 Sep 2016 || 26 || align=left | Disc.: NEATAdded on 19 October 2020 || 
|- id="2003 QA125" bgcolor=#E9E9E9
| 0 ||  || MBA-M || 17.96 || data-sort-value="0.76" | 760 m || multiple || 2003–2022 || 25 Jan 2022 || 54 || align=left | Disc.: NEATAdded on 17 January 2021 || 
|- id="2003 QB125" bgcolor=#d6d6d6
| 0 ||  || MBA-O || 16.9 || 2.3 km || multiple || 2003–2020 || 08 Dec 2020 || 102 || align=left | Disc.: NEATAdded on 17 January 2021Alt.: 2019 MU14 || 
|- id="2003 QC125" bgcolor=#fefefe
| 1 ||  || MBA-I || 18.9 || data-sort-value="0.49" | 490 m || multiple || 2003–2020 || 01 Feb 2020 || 30 || align=left | Disc.: MLSAdded on 17 January 2021 || 
|- id="2003 QD125" bgcolor=#E9E9E9
| 1 ||  || MBA-M || 18.3 || data-sort-value="0.65" | 650 m || multiple || 2003–2020 || 06 Dec 2020 || 47 || align=left | Disc.: Cerro TololoAdded on 17 January 2021 || 
|- id="2003 QE125" bgcolor=#E9E9E9
| 0 ||  || MBA-M || 17.92 || 1.1 km || multiple || 2003–2021 || 13 Oct 2021 || 60 || align=left | Disc.: Cerro TololoAdded on 17 January 2021 || 
|- id="2003 QF125" bgcolor=#E9E9E9
| 0 ||  || MBA-M || 17.3 || 1.0 km || multiple || 2003–2021 || 09 Jan 2021 || 64 || align=left | Disc.: NEATAdded on 17 January 2021 || 
|- id="2003 QJ125" bgcolor=#d6d6d6
| 3 ||  || HIL || 16.8 || 2.4 km || multiple || 2003–2020 || 11 Dec 2020 || 23 || align=left | Disc.: Cerro TololoAdded on 9 March 2021 || 
|- id="2003 QK125" bgcolor=#E9E9E9
| 2 ||  || MBA-M || 18.9 || data-sort-value="0.70" | 700 m || multiple || 2003–2020 || 13 Sep 2020 || 27 || align=left | Disc.: Cerro TololoAdded on 9 March 2021 || 
|- id="2003 QL125" bgcolor=#E9E9E9
| 1 ||  || MBA-M || 18.2 || data-sort-value="0.68" | 680 m || multiple || 2003–2020 || 17 Nov 2020 || 26 || align=left | Disc.: Cerro TololoAdded on 11 May 2021 || 
|- id="2003 QO125" bgcolor=#E9E9E9
| 0 ||  || MBA-M || 18.02 || 1.4 km || multiple || 2003–2021 || 06 Nov 2021 || 88 || align=left | Disc.: Cerro TololoAdded on 17 June 2021 || 
|- id="2003 QP125" bgcolor=#E9E9E9
| 0 ||  || MBA-M || 17.71 || 1.6 km || multiple || 2003–2021 || 13 Jul 2021 || 54 || align=left | Disc.: SpacewatchAdded on 17 June 2021 || 
|- id="2003 QQ125" bgcolor=#d6d6d6
| 0 ||  || MBA-O || 17.7 || 1.6 km || multiple || 2003–2021 || 08 May 2021 || 32 || align=left | Disc.: MLSAdded on 17 June 2021 || 
|- id="2003 QR125" bgcolor=#E9E9E9
| 1 ||  || MBA-M || 18.3 || data-sort-value="0.92" | 920 m || multiple || 2003–2016 || 13 Jun 2016 || 20 || align=left | Disc.: NEATAdded on 21 August 2021 || 
|- id="2003 QS125" bgcolor=#fefefe
| 0 ||  || MBA-I || 18.9 || data-sort-value="0.49" | 490 m || multiple || 2003–2021 || 08 Jul 2021 || 39 || align=left | Disc.: MLSAdded on 21 August 2021 || 
|- id="2003 QT125" bgcolor=#d6d6d6
| 0 ||  || MBA-O || 17.67 || 1.6 km || multiple || 2002–2018 || 13 Jul 2018 || 36 || align=left | Disc.: Cerro TololoAdded on 21 August 2021 || 
|- id="2003 QU125" bgcolor=#E9E9E9
| 1 ||  || MBA-M || 18.55 || 1.1 km || multiple || 2003–2021 || 28 Oct 2021 || 47 || align=left | Disc.: Cerro TololoAdded on 30 September 2021 || 
|- id="2003 QX125" bgcolor=#fefefe
| 0 ||  || MBA-I || 18.79 || data-sort-value="0.52" | 520 m || multiple || 1997–2021 || 12 Sep 2021 || 85 || align=left | Disc.: MLSAdded on 30 September 2021 || 
|- id="2003 QY125" bgcolor=#E9E9E9
| 0 ||  || MBA-M || 17.08 || 2.1 km || multiple || 2003–2022 || 06 Jan 2022 || 152 || align=left | Disc.: NEATAdded on 30 September 2021 || 
|- id="2003 QA126" bgcolor=#E9E9E9
| 0 ||  || MBA-M || 18.09 || 1.0 km || multiple || 2003–2021 || 30 Oct 2021 || 55 || align=left | Disc.: SpacewatchAdded on 30 September 2021 || 
|- id="2003 QB126" bgcolor=#fefefe
| 0 ||  || MBA-I || 19.09 || data-sort-value="0.45" | 450 m || multiple || 2002–2021 || 09 May 2021 || 24 || align=left | Disc.: Pan-STARRSAdded on 5 November 2021 || 
|- id="2003 QC126" bgcolor=#E9E9E9
| 0 ||  || MBA-M || 17.37 || 1.4 km || multiple || 2003–2022 || 04 Jan 2022 || 96 || align=left | Disc.: NEATAdded on 5 November 2021 || 
|- id="2003 QD126" bgcolor=#d6d6d6
| 0 ||  || MBA-O || 16.53 || 2.8 km || multiple || 2003–2021 || 04 Dec 2021 || 68 || align=left | Disc.: SpacewatchAdded on 5 November 2021 || 
|- id="2003 QE126" bgcolor=#fefefe
| 0 ||  || MBA-I || 18.92 || data-sort-value="0.49" | 490 m || multiple || 2003–2021 || 09 Nov 2021 || 51 || align=left | Disc.: No observationsAdded on 5 November 2021 || 
|- id="2003 QG126" bgcolor=#d6d6d6
| 0 ||  || MBA-O || 17.82 || 1.5 km || multiple || 2003–2020 || 26 Jan 2020 || 36 || align=left | Disc.: MLSAdded on 24 December 2021 || 
|- id="2003 QH126" bgcolor=#E9E9E9
| 2 ||  || MBA-M || 18.1 || 1.3 km || multiple || 2003–2021 || 07 Sep 2021 || 26 || align=left | Disc.: Cerro Tololo Obs.Added on 24 December 2021 || 
|- id="2003 QJ126" bgcolor=#E9E9E9
| 0 ||  || MBA-M || 17.7 || 1.2 km || multiple || 2003–2021 || 26 Nov 2021 || 45 || align=left | Disc.: Cerro Tololo Obs.Added on 29 January 2022 || 
|}
back to top

R 

|- id="2003 RL" bgcolor=#FA8072
| 6 || 2003 RL || MCA || 20.4 || data-sort-value="0.35" | 350 m || single || 31 days || 03 Oct 2003 || 38 || align=left | Disc.: LINEAR || 
|- id="2003 RV" bgcolor=#fefefe
| 1 || 2003 RV || MBA-I || 18.4 || data-sort-value="0.62" | 620 m || multiple || 2003–2020 || 11 May 2020 || 131 || align=left | Disc.: LINEARAlt.: 2010 JK66, 2010 PR73 || 
|- id="2003 RS1" bgcolor=#FFC2E0
| 0 ||  || APO || 21.7 || data-sort-value="0.16" | 160 m || multiple || 2003–2017 || 27 Jul 2017 || 280 || align=left | Disc.: LINEARPotentially hazardous object || 
|- id="2003 RE2" bgcolor=#FFC2E0
| 5 ||  || AMO || 23.0 || data-sort-value="0.089" | 89 m || single || 46 days || 19 Oct 2003 || 49 || align=left | Disc.: LINEAR || 
|- id="2003 RY2" bgcolor=#FA8072
| 0 ||  || MCA || 18.16 || data-sort-value="0.69" | 690 m || multiple || 2003–2021 || 10 Nov 2021 || 138 || align=left | Disc.: LINEAR || 
|- id="2003 RC3" bgcolor=#fefefe
| 0 ||  || MBA-I || 18.09 || data-sort-value="0.72" | 720 m || multiple || 2002–2021 || 11 May 2021 || 105 || align=left | Disc.: LINEARAlt.: 2010 GS132, 2010 PX82, 2018 RO30 || 
|- id="2003 RB5" bgcolor=#FFC2E0
| 5 ||  || APO || 21.2 || data-sort-value="0.20" | 200 m || single || 15 days || 19 Sep 2003 || 237 || align=left | Disc.: LINEARPotentially hazardous object || 
|- id="2003 RD5" bgcolor=#FFC2E0
| 7 ||  || AMO || 23.4 || data-sort-value="0.074" | 74 m || single || 17 days || 18 Sep 2003 || 21 || align=left | Disc.: LINEAR || 
|- id="2003 RE5" bgcolor=#FA8072
| – ||  || MCA || 22.5 || data-sort-value="0.094" | 94 m || single || 1 day || 05 Sep 2003 || 12 || align=left | Disc.: LPL/Spacewatch II || 
|- id="2003 RY5" bgcolor=#FA8072
| 1 ||  || MCA || 17.2 || 2.2 km || multiple || 2003–2021 || 18 Jan 2021 || 169 || align=left | Disc.: LINEAR || 
|- id="2003 RZ5" bgcolor=#FA8072
| 0 ||  || MCA || 17.31 || 1.9 km || multiple || 2003–2022 || 05 Jan 2022 || 291 || align=left | Disc.: AMOS || 
|- id="2003 RK7" bgcolor=#E9E9E9
| 1 ||  || MBA-M || 17.9 || 1.1 km || multiple || 2003–2020 || 14 Dec 2020 || 238 || align=left | Disc.: CINEOS || 
|- id="2003 RL7" bgcolor=#E9E9E9
| 1 ||  || MBA-M || 17.6 || data-sort-value="0.90" | 900 m || multiple || 2002–2019 || 26 Jul 2019 || 87 || align=left | Disc.: CINEOS || 
|- id="2003 RS8" bgcolor=#FA8072
| 0 ||  || MCA || 17.2 || 1.1 km || multiple || 2000–2021 || 16 Jan 2021 || 163 || align=left | Disc.: LINEARAlt.: 2000 AE4 || 
|- id="2003 RJ9" bgcolor=#d6d6d6
| 0 ||  || MBA-O || 16.3 || 3.1 km || multiple || 2002–2021 || 10 Jan 2021 || 96 || align=left | Disc.: SpacewatchAlt.: 2016 AY139 || 
|- id="2003 RM9" bgcolor=#d6d6d6
| 0 ||  || MBA-O || 16.30 || 3.1 km || multiple || 2003–2022 || 06 Jan 2022 || 326 || align=left | Disc.: LINEAR || 
|- id="2003 RH10" bgcolor=#d6d6d6
| 0 ||  || MBA-O || 17.1 || 2.1 km || multiple || 2003–2021 || 16 Jan 2021 || 158 || align=left | Disc.: Table Mountain Obs.Alt.: 2008 OR25 || 
|- id="2003 RL10" bgcolor=#FFC2E0
| 0 ||  || AMO || 19.4 || data-sort-value="0.47" | 470 m || multiple || 2003–2007 || 15 Jun 2007 || 167 || align=left | Disc.: LINEAR || 
|- id="2003 RW10" bgcolor=#FFC2E0
| 1 ||  || AMO || 19.2 || data-sort-value="0.51" | 510 m || multiple || 2003–2019 || 19 Nov 2019 || 108 || align=left | Disc.: LONEOS || 
|- id="2003 RM11" bgcolor=#FFE699
| 0 ||  || Asteroid || 18.1 || 1.3 km || multiple || 2003–2020 || 26 Jul 2020 || 67 || align=left | Disc.: NEATMCA at MPC || 
|- id="2003 RQ11" bgcolor=#E9E9E9
| 0 ||  || MBA-M || 17.3 || 1.5 km || multiple || 2003–2020 || 15 Dec 2020 || 220 || align=left | Disc.: Table Mountain Obs. || 
|- id="2003 RS11" bgcolor=#E9E9E9
| 0 ||  || MBA-M || 17.32 || 1.9 km || multiple || 2003–2021 || 09 Nov 2021 || 101 || align=left | Disc.: Table Mountain Obs.Alt.: 2012 SQ36 || 
|- id="2003 RU11" bgcolor=#FFC2E0
| 3 ||  || ATE || 25.5 || data-sort-value="0.028" | 28 m || single || 4 days || 17 Sep 2003 || 31 || align=left | Disc.: LINEAR || 
|- id="2003 RV11" bgcolor=#FA8072
| 0 ||  || MCA || 18.09 || data-sort-value="0.72" | 720 m || multiple || 2003–2022 || 26 Jan 2022 || 157 || align=left | Disc.: NEAT || 
|- id="2003 RW11" bgcolor=#FFC2E0
| 1 ||  || APO || 18.7 || 1.5 km || multiple || 2003–2016 || 24 Sep 2016 || 158 || align=left | Disc.: Table Mountain Obs. || 
|- id="2003 RX11" bgcolor=#FA8072
| 1 ||  || MCA || 19.1 || data-sort-value="0.45" | 450 m || multiple || 2003–2021 || 18 Jan 2021 || 131 || align=left | Disc.: NEAT || 
|- id="2003 RQ13" bgcolor=#E9E9E9
| 0 ||  || MBA-M || 16.6 || 2.0 km || multiple || 2003–2020 || 18 Jul 2020 || 215 || align=left | Disc.: NEAT || 
|- id="2003 RW14" bgcolor=#E9E9E9
| 1 ||  || MBA-M || 17.0 || 1.7 km || multiple || 2003–2021 || 05 Jan 2021 || 226 || align=left | Disc.: NEAT || 
|- id="2003 RE15" bgcolor=#E9E9E9
| 1 ||  || MBA-M || 16.9 || 1.2 km || multiple || 2003–2021 || 11 Jan 2021 || 228 || align=left | Disc.: NEAT || 
|- id="2003 RJ15" bgcolor=#E9E9E9
| 0 ||  || MBA-M || 17.1 || 1.6 km || multiple || 2003–2021 || 12 Jan 2021 || 222 || align=left | Disc.: AMOS || 
|- id="2003 RB16" bgcolor=#FA8072
| 2 ||  || MCA || 17.9 || data-sort-value="0.78" | 780 m || multiple || 2003–2021 || 17 Jan 2021 || 104 || align=left | Disc.: NEAT || 
|- id="2003 RW16" bgcolor=#E9E9E9
| 0 ||  || MBA-M || 16.8 || 1.8 km || multiple || 2003–2021 || 08 Jan 2021 || 234 || align=left | Disc.: NEAT || 
|- id="2003 RZ16" bgcolor=#E9E9E9
| 0 ||  || MBA-M || 17.14 || 1.6 km || multiple || 2003–2021 || 25 Nov 2021 || 95 || align=left | Disc.: NEATAlt.: 2015 EB73 || 
|- id="2003 RF17" bgcolor=#E9E9E9
| 0 ||  || MBA-M || 17.77 || 1.6 km || multiple || 1999–2021 || 24 Nov 2021 || 120 || align=left | Disc.: NEATAlt.: 2012 RE21 || 
|- id="2003 RA23" bgcolor=#d6d6d6
| 1 ||  || MBA-O || 17.60 || 1.7 km || multiple || 2003–2019 || 28 Nov 2019 || 46 || align=left | Disc.: Table MountainAdded on 9 March 2021Alt.: 2019 TJ17 || 
|- id="2003 RF25" bgcolor=#E9E9E9
| 0 ||  || MBA-M || 17.2 || 1.1 km || multiple || 2003–2021 || 21 Jan 2021 || 110 || align=left | Disc.: NEATAlt.: 2011 QO65 || 
|- id="2003 RT27" bgcolor=#fefefe
| 1 ||  || MBA-I || 19.4 || data-sort-value="0.39" | 390 m || multiple || 2003–2021 || 16 May 2021 || 74 || align=left | Disc.: Spacewatch || 
|- id="2003 RA28" bgcolor=#fefefe
| 0 ||  || MBA-I || 17.70 || data-sort-value="0.86" | 860 m || multiple || 2003–2021 || 24 Nov 2021 || 155 || align=left | Disc.: NEAT || 
|- id="2003 RC28" bgcolor=#fefefe
| 0 ||  || MBA-I || 18.79 || data-sort-value="0.52" | 520 m || multiple || 2003–2021 || 30 Jun 2021 || 61 || align=left | Disc.: Spacewatch || 
|- id="2003 RD28" bgcolor=#E9E9E9
| 0 ||  || MBA-M || 17.69 || 1.6 km || multiple || 2003–2021 || 27 Nov 2021 || 95 || align=left | Disc.: Spacewatch || 
|- id="2003 RE28" bgcolor=#d6d6d6
| 0 ||  || MBA-O || 16.9 || 2.3 km || multiple || 2003–2019 || 03 Oct 2019 || 55 || align=left | Disc.: Spacewatch || 
|- id="2003 RG28" bgcolor=#d6d6d6
| 0 ||  || MBA-O || 16.7 || 2.5 km || multiple || 2003–2021 || 09 Jan 2021 || 85 || align=left | Disc.: LPL/Spacewatch IIAlt.: 2010 AF135 || 
|- id="2003 RH28" bgcolor=#d6d6d6
| 0 ||  || MBA-O || 17.1 || 2.1 km || multiple || 2003–2021 || 16 Jan 2021 || 62 || align=left | Disc.: Spacewatch || 
|- id="2003 RN28" bgcolor=#E9E9E9
| 0 ||  || MBA-M || 17.49 || 1.8 km || multiple || 2003–2021 || 30 Jul 2021 || 81 || align=left | Disc.: Spacewatch || 
|- id="2003 RO28" bgcolor=#E9E9E9
| 0 ||  || MBA-M || 17.77 || 1.6 km || multiple || 2003–2021 || 02 Oct 2021 || 62 || align=left | Disc.: Spacewatch || 
|- id="2003 RR28" bgcolor=#E9E9E9
| 1 ||  || MBA-M || 17.9 || data-sort-value="0.78" | 780 m || multiple || 2003–2021 || 17 Jan 2021 || 32 || align=left | Disc.: Spacewatch || 
|- id="2003 RS28" bgcolor=#E9E9E9
| 0 ||  || MBA-M || 18.31 || data-sort-value="0.92" | 920 m || multiple || 2003–2021 || 30 Nov 2021 || 58 || align=left | Disc.: Spacewatch || 
|- id="2003 RT28" bgcolor=#d6d6d6
| 0 ||  || MBA-O || 15.8 || 3.9 km || multiple || 2003–2020 || 23 Jan 2020 || 49 || align=left | Disc.: LPL/Spacewatch IIAdded on 13 September 2020 || 
|}
back to top

References 
 

Lists of unnumbered minor planets